This page lists the members of Stanford University, including students, alumni, faculty and academic affiliates associated.

Stanford office

Presidents 
Acting presidents were temporary appointments. Swain served while Wilbur was United States Secretary of the Interior under Herbert Hoover; Eurich and Faust after the unexpected death of Tresidder.

Color key

Provosts
The position was created in 1952.

Chancellors
This position is often empty and has always been held by a former president.

School Deans
Though Stanford did not originally have schools, over the years the departments have all been collected into schools.

Color key

Alumni

Academics

Presidents and chancellors of universities and colleges
Gene D. Block (A.B. 1970), 8th chancellor of University of California, Los Angeles
Derek Bok (A.B. 1951), 25th president of Harvard University
José Antonio Bowen (A.B., M.S., Ph.D. 1994), 11th president of Goucher College
Avishay Braverman (Ph.D. 1976), 5th president of the Ben-Gurion University of the Negev
John C. Bravman (B.S. 1979, M.S. 1981, Ph.D. 1985), 17th president of Bucknell University
William R. Brody (M.D. 1970, Ph.D. 1972), 13th president of Johns Hopkins University
Frederic Lister Burk (A.M. 1892), 1st president of San Francisco State University
Menzies Campbell (LL.M. 1967), 37th chancellor of the University of St Andrews
Nancy Cantor (Ph.D. 1978), 11th chancellor and president of Syracuse University
Brian Casey (J.D. 1988), 19th president of DePauw University
Joseph I. Castro (Ph.D. 1998), 8th chancellor of the California State University System, 9th president of the California State University, Fresno
Jean-Lou Chameau (Ph.D. 1981), 8th president of California Institute of Technology
France A. Córdova (A.B. 1969), 11th president of Purdue University
Paul Davenport (A.B. 1969), 9th president of the University of Western Ontario
Sean M. Decatur (Ph.D. 1995), 19th president of Kenyon College
Rolando Ramos Dizon (Ph.D. 1978), 20th president of De La Salle University
Michael V. Drake (A.B. 1974), 21st president of the University of California System, 15th president of the Ohio State University, and 5th chancellor of University of California, Irvine
Vartan Gregorian (A.B. 1958; Ph.D. 1964), 16th president of Brown University, president of the Carnegie Corporation of New York, president of the New York Public Library, provost of the University of Pennsylvania, Presidential Medal of Freedom recipient
Claudine Gay, president-designate of Harvard, second woman and first African-American to serve as president of Harvard
William Westley Guth (A.B. 1892), attorney, president of University of the Pacific and 3rd president of Goucher College
Jonathan Holloway (A.B. 1989), historian, 21st president of Rutgers University 
Kristina Johnson (B.S. 1981, M.S. 1981, Ph.D. 1984), 16th president of Ohio State University, US Undersecretary of Energy, former provost of Johns Hopkins University, holder of 100+ patents
Clark Kerr (A.M. 1933), 12th president of the University of California System and first chancellor of UC Berkeley
Heather Knight (Ph.D. 1991), 21st president of Pacific Union College
William P. Leahy (Ph.D. 1986), 25th president of Boston College
Lee Si-Chen (M.S. 1977, Ph.D. 1981), 10th president of National Taiwan University
Rick Levin (A.B. 1968), 22nd president of Yale University
Edna Ahgeak MacLean (Ph.D. 1995), 2nd president of Iḷisaġvik College
Thomas L. Magnanti (M.S. 1969, M.S. 1972, Ph.D. 1972), founding president of Singapore University of Technology and Design
Lynn Mahoney (A.B. 1986), 14th president of San Francisco State University
Alan G. Merten (M.S. 1964), 5th president of George Mason University
Bienvenido Nebres (M.S. 1967, Ph.D. 1970), 29th president of Ateneo de Manila University
Vincent Price (A.M. 1985, Ph.D. 1987), 10th president of Duke University
Edward John Ray (A.M. 1969, Ph.D. 1971), 13th president of Oregon State University
L. Rafael Reif (Ph.D. 1979), 17th president of MIT
Peter Salovey (A.B. 1980, A.M. 1980), 23rd president of Yale University
Robert N. Shelton (B.S. 1970), 19th president of the University of Arizona
Su Guaning (M.S. 1983, Ph.D. 1984), 2nd president of Nanyang Technological University
Steven C. Wheelwright (M.B.A. 1969, Ph.D. 1970), 9th president of Brigham Young University–Hawaii
Jason Wingard (A.B. 1995), 12th president of Temple University
Menahem Yaari (Ph.D. 1962), Israeli economist, S.A. Schonbrunn Professor of Mathematical Economics at The Hebrew University of Jerusalem, President of the Open University of Israel

Academia 
 Cara Drinan (J.D. 2002), author and professor of law at Catholic University
 Michelle Alexander (J.D. 1992), civil rights activist and professor of law at Ohio State University
 Lawrence J. Baack (Ph.D. 1973), historian specializing in modern European history; former vice chairperson of the History Department at University of Nebraska, Lincoln; visiting scholar at the University of California, Berkeley 
 Jeremy M. Berg (B.S. 1980), director of the National Institute of General Medical Sciences (NIGMS)
 Roger Boesche (B.A., Ph.D.), professor of the history of ideas at Occidental College
Hal Brands (B.A. 2005), professor of global affairs at Johns Hopkins University
Yolanda Broyles-Gonzalez (Ph.D. 1981), professor and chair of American ethnic studies, Kansas State University
Albert Edward Caswell (A.B. 1908, Ph.D. 1911), physicist and chair of University of Oregon Department of Physics 1914–1949, Fellow of American Physical Society
 Marjorie Cohn (A.B. 1970), professor of law at the Thomas Jefferson School of Law and a former president of the National Lawyers Guild
Steven R. David (A.M. 1975), professor of international relations, associate dean of academic affairs at Johns Hopkins University
Steven D'Hondt (B.S. 1984), professor of oceanography at the University of Rhode Island
Edward McNeil Farmer (A.B. 1923, A.M. 1926), professor in the Graphic Arts Department at Stanford University from 1923 until 1964
George E. Frakes (A.B. 1954), professor emeritus of history and geography at Santa Barbara City College
H. Bruce Franklin (Ph.D. 1961), professor of English and American studies at Rutgers University in Newark, New Jersey
James Paul Gee (A.M. 1974, Ph.D. 1975), linguist, literacy researcher, and Mary Lou Fulton Presidential Professor of Literacy Studies at Arizona State University
Larry Gladney (Ph.D. 1985), professor of physics at Yale University
William Gorham (A.B. 1952), economist, president of the Urban Institute 1968–2000
Daniel Harrison (A.B. 1981), chairman of the Department of Music at Yale University
Leslie P. Hume (A.M. 1971, Ph.D. 1979), historian and philanthropist, former president of the Stanford University Board of trustees (2008–2012)
Russell Jeung (B.A., M.A), professor of Asian American studies at San Francisco State University, co-founder of Stop AAPI Hate
Grace Y. Kao (B.A., M.A.), professor of Ethics at Claremont School of Theology
 Amos Lapidot, Israeli fighter pilot, 10th Commander of the Israeli Air Force, and President of Technion – Israel Institute of Technology
Mark Lemley (A.B. 1988), professor at Stanford Law School, expert in patent law
David Lang, professor of Composition at the Yale School of Music (B.A.)
Lisa Lowe (A.B. 1977), Samuel Knight Professor of American Studies at Yale University
Thomas L. Magnanti (M.S. 1969, M.S. 1972, Ph.D. 1972), former dean of the MIT School of Engineering
Virginia Matzek (Ph.D.), Associate Professor in Environmental Studies and Sciences at Santa Clara University
H. Brett Melendy (A.B. 1946, A.M. 1948, Ph.D. 1952), American historian and administrator at San Jose State University and the University of Hawaii
Sherman Mellinkoff (B.S. 1941, M.D. 1944), second dean of the School of Medicine at the University of California, Los Angeles
Ricardo Felipe Munoz (B.A. 1972), Distinguished Professor of Clinical Psychology at Palo Alto University
Charles Ogletree (A.B. 1975, A.M. 1975), professor at Harvard Law School, founder of the school's Charles Hamilton Houston Institute for Race and Justice, author of numerous books on legal topics
Charles V. Park (A.B. 1909), director of the Central Michigan University Libraries
Joachim Remak (Ph.D. 1955), professor of history at the University of California, Santa Barbara
John C. Rule (A.B., M.A., 1952), historian of 17th- and 18th-century France at the Ohio State University
Mavis Sanders (A.M. 1992, Ph.D. 1995), research scholar
David Schaberg (B.A.), Dean of Humanities at UCLA, winner of the 2003 Joseph Levenson Book Prize
Dale Schunk (Ph.D.), former dean of the School of Education, University of North Carolina at Greensboro
Michael Smith (Ph.D. 1993), dean of the Faculty of Arts and Science at Harvard University
Victoria Stodden (Ph.D., J.D.), associate professor of information sciences at University of Illinois Urbana-Champaign
Robert E. Swain (B.S. 1899), head of Stanford's Department of Chemistry and a founder of the Stanford Research Institute
Tony Tether (M.S. 1965, Ph.D. 1969), former director of the Defense Advanced Research Projects Agency (DARPA)
Mark von Hagen (A.M. 1981, Ph.D. 1985), director of the School of Historical, Philosophical and Religious Studies at Arizona State University
Richard D. Wolff (A.M. 1964), Marxist economist and professor of economics emeritus at the University of Massachusetts Amherst
David Alvra Wood (M.D. 1930), president of the American Cancer Society, first director of the University of California, San Francisco Cancer Research Institute
Ben Zinn (M.S. 1962), international soccer player and academic at Georgia Tech
KJ Cerankowski (Ph.D. 2014), assistant professor at Oberlin College and co-founder of the field of asexuality studies
Peter Zemsky (Ph.D. 1995), dean of executive education and Eli Lilly chaired professor of strategy and innovation at INSEAD
Gita Sen (Ph.D.), feminist economist and scholar on international population policy who has consulted for the United Nations System, adjunct professor at Harvard University and Professor Emeritus at Indian Institute of Management Bangalore
Natalie Roe (Ph.D. 1989), Director of the Physics Division at Lawrence Berkeley National Laboratory
John Kenneth Salisbury, Jr. (Ph.D.), Roboticist and Research Professor Emeritus at Stanford's Computer Science Department and Stanford School of Medicine's Department of Surgery.
Frank Shuffelton (d. 2010), literary scholar
Joel Westheimer, professor of citizenship education at the University of Ottawa
Melissa Franklin (Ph.D. 1982) Mallinckrodt Professor of physics at Harvard University. She notably contributed to the discovery of the top quark (a fundamental particle of the Standard Model) while working on the Collider Detector at Fermilab, and was the first woman to receive tenure in the Physics Department at Harvard University.

Computer science and electrical engineering
 
Norman Abramson (Ph.D. in EE), 2007 Alexander Graham Bell prize winner, developed the world's first wireless computer communication network, ALOHAnet
Anant Agarwal (Ph.D. in EE), president of EdX at MIT
Ružena Bajcsy (Ph.D. in CS), winner of 2009 Benjamin Franklin Medal in Computer and Cognitive Science
Andy Bechtolsheim (Ph.D. dropout), designer of the first networked SUN workstation
Anant Bhardwaj (M.S. in CS), founder of Instabase 
Lawrence M. Breed (M.S.), created the first computer animation language, MACS; Grace Murray Hopper Award winner
Sergey Brin (M.S.), developer of Google search engine, Marconi Prize winner
David Boggs (Ph.D.), co-inventor of Ethernet
Rodney Brooks (Ph.D. 1981), director of MIT computer science and artificial intelligence lab, winner of IJCAI Computers and Thought Award
Vint Cerf (B.S. 1965, former professor), Internet pioneer, co-inventor of TCP/IP internet protocol, Turing Award and Marconi Prize-winning computer scientist, inducted into National Inventors Hall of Fame
Donald D. Chamberlin (M.S., Ph.D. in EE), coinventor of SQL (Structured Query Language), SIGMOD Edgar F. Codd Innovations Award winner
Morris Chang (Ph.D. in EE), founder, as well as former chairman and CEO, of Taiwan Semiconductor Manufacturing Company, 2010 winner of IEEE Medal of Honor
Surajit Chaudhuri, Ph.D. in CS, SIGMOD Edgar F. Codd Innovations Award winner
Mung Chiang (B.S. 1999, M.S. 2000, Ph.D. 2003), Arthur LeGrand Doty Professor of Electrical Engineering, Princeton University; 2013 Alan T. Waterman Award recipient
John M. Cioffi (Ph.D. in EE), pioneer in Digital subscriber line (DSL), winner of Marconi Prize and IEEE Alexander Bell prize
Thomas M. Cover (Ph.D. in EE 1964), information theorist; winner of Shannon prize and Hamming medal
Donald Cox (Ph.D. in EE), winner of IEEE Alexander Bell prize
Steve Deering (Ph.D. in EE), inventor of IP multicast, a technique for one-to-many and many-to-many real-time communication over an IP infrastructure in a network
Whitfield Diffie (Ph.D., dropout), pioneer in public key cryptography, noted for Diffie-Hellman-Merkle public key exchange, inducted into National Inventors Hall of Fame, Marconi Prize winner
Les Earnest, research scientist, created the first spell check and first cursive-writing recognizer
David Eppstein (B.S. 1984), computer scientist
Paul Flaherty (MS, Ph.D.), inventor of AltaVista search engine
Scott Forstall (B.S., M.S.), former senior vice president of iPhone software at Apple Inc.
Richard P. Gabriel (Ph.D.), computer scientist
Héctor García-Molina (Ph.D. and professor in CS), SIGMOD Edgar F. Codd Innovations Award winner
Craig Gentry (Ph.D.), computer scientist; 2010 Grace Murray Hopper Award winner; noted for solving "fully homomorphic encryption", a breakthrough in public-key encryption
Edward Ginzton (Ph.D. and professor), pioneer of microwave electronics, winner of IEEE Medal of Honor
Ian Goodfellow (B.S., M.S.), developer of generative adversarial networks
Susan L. Graham (Ph.D. in CS), IEEE John Von Neumann prize winner
William Webster Hansen (Ph.D. and professor), pioneer of microwave electronics
Stephen E. Harris (M.S., Ph.D. in EE), noted for "slow" light research
Martin Hellman (M.S. 1967, Ph.D. 1969 in EE and professor), pioneer in public-key cryptography, noted for Diffie-Hellman-Merkle public key exchange, Marconi Prize winner, inducted into National Inventors Hall of Fame
Charles Herrold (graduate), creator of the first radio station in the world
William Hewlett (B.E., M.E. in EE), founder of Hewlett-Packard, National Medal of Science winner
Ted Hoff (Ph.D. 1962), inventor of microprocessor, winner of Kyoto Prize, inducted into National Inventors Hall of Fame, winner of National Medal of Technology and Innovation
John Hopcroft (Ph.D. 1964 in EE and professor), Turing Award-winning computer scientist
Daniel Henry Holmes Ingalls, Jr. (M.S. in CS), Grace Murray Hopper Award winner
Leslie Kaelbling (Ph.D. in CS), winner of IJCAI Computers and Thought Award
Thomas Kailath professor in EE, 2007 winner of IEEE medal of honor
Lydia Kavraki (Ph.D. in CS), 2000 Grace Murray Hopper Award winner
Alan Kay (Postdoc), Turing Award-winning computer scientist
Dan Klein (Ph.D. in CS), 2006 Grace Murray Hopper Award winner
Daphne Koller (Ph.D.), Stanford CS professor, winner of ACM-Infosys Foundation Award, winner of IJCAI Computers and Thought Award
Douglas Lenat (Ph.D. in CS and former professor), winner of IJCAI Computers and Thought Award
Barbara Liskov (Ph.D.), first female Ph.D. in computer science in US, MIT Ford professor, Turing Award winner
John N. Little (M.E. 1980), co-creator of MATLAB
Albert Macovski (Ph.D. and Prof), authority on computerized imaging systems with 150 patents
Theodore Maiman (M.E. in EE, Ph.D. in physics), inventor of ruby laser, the first working laser in the world; National Inventors Hall of Fame
Jitendra Malik (Ph.D. 1985), CS professor at UC Berkeley
Scott A. McGregor (B.A., M.S. 1978), lead developer of Windows 1.0 and former CEO of Philips Semiconductors and Broadcom Corporation
James Meindl, former professor, 2006 winner of IEEE medal of honor
Ralph Merkle (Ph.D. 1979, EE), pioneer in public key cryptography, noted for Diffie-Hellman-Merkle public key exchange, inducted into National Inventors Hall of Fame
Tom M. Mitchell (Ph.D. in computer science), professor and head of the machine learning department at CMU, winner of IJCAI Computers and Thought Award
Cleve Moler (Ph.D., M.E. 1980), co-creator of MATLAB
Roger Moore, Grace Murray Hopper Award winner
Hans Moravec (Ph.D. 1980), co-designer of Stanford CART, the first computer-controlled robot car
Allen Newell (B.S.), pioneer of artificial intelligence, Turing Award-winning computer scientist
Ren Ng (Ph.D. in CS), founder and chief executive officer of Lytro, a Mountain View, California-based startup company, which is developing consumer light-field cameras based on Ng's graduate research at Stanford University
Nils Nilsson (Ph.D. 1958, CS), led the effort in developing Shakey the robot at SRI, the first mobile robot that could think independently and interact with its surroundings; Kumagai Professor of Engineering, Emeritus in Computer Science at Stanford University
Jim K. Omura (Ph.D. in EE), Alexander Graham Bell prize winner
David Packard (BA, MA EE), cofounder of HP Inc., 1988 winner of national medal of technology, and of presidential medal of freedom
Larry Page (M.S.), developer of Google search engine, Marconi Prize winner
Kumar Patel (Ph.D. in EE), inventor of carbon Dioxidelaser, National Medal of Science winner
Arogyaswami Paulraj, professor in EE, 2011 Alexander Graham Bell prize winner
Donald Pederson (Ph.D. in EE), pioneer in SPICE, winner of IEEE medal of honor
Amir Pnueli (Postdoc), Turing Award-winning computer scientist
Raj Reddy (Ph.D. 1966, former professor), Turing Award-winning computer scientist, founder of robotics institute at Carnegie Mellon University
Rafael Reif (Ph.D. in EE, 1979), current president of MIT 
Ronald Rivest (Ph.D. 1974, former professor), cryptographer, Turing Award-winning computer scientist
Stuart Russell (Ph.D. 1986, CS), chair of CS at UC-Berkeley, winner of IJCAI Computers and Thought Award
Mike Schroepfer (B.S. 1997 and M.S. 1999), led development of the Firefox browser at Mozilla; now vice president of engineering at Facebook
Edward Shortliffe (Ph.D.), Grace Murray Hopper Award winner, inventor of the rule-based pharmacological expert system: Mycin
Charles Simonyi (M.S., Ph.D. 1977, CS), inventor of Microsoft Word, former chief architect at Microsoft
Daniel Sleator (Ph.D.), computer scientist
Michael D. Smith (Ph.D. in EE 1993), dean of the Faculty of Arts and Science at Harvard University 
Alfred Spector (Ph.D.), computer scientist
Robert Tarjan (Ph.D. 1972, former professor), Turing Award-winning computer scientist
Frederick Terman (B.S. in chemistry, M.E. in EE), "father of Silicon Valley", National Medal of Science winner
Russell Varian (Ph.D.), co-inventor of Klystron, the foundation of RADAR
Sigurd Varian (M.S.), co-inventor of Klystron, the foundation of RADAR
Jeffrey Scott Vitter (Ph.D. in CS 1980), provost at the University of Kansas
John Robert Woodyard (Ph.D. 1940), pioneer in microwave electronics, inventor of "doping" in semiconductors
Kevin Zhu (Ph.D.), IT for business, data analytics, e-commerce, software, digital transformation

Other science
Nnaemeka Alfred Achebe (B.S. in chemistry, 1966), Nigerian monarch and banker
Ramesh K. Agarwal (Ph.D. in AA, 1975), William Palm Professor of Engineering at Washington University, computational fluid dynamicist
James B. Aguayo-Martel (M.D. 1981, M.P.H. 1981), chairman, Department of Surgery, inventor of NMR microscopy and Deuterium NMR spectroscopy
Susan Athey (Ph.D. in business school), winner of John Bates Clark Medal (2007) in economics
David Benaron (postdoc), former professor in pediatrics and neonatology, digital health entrepreneur, specialist in medical imaging, monitoring and analysis, co-inventor of "glowing mice" imaging technique
Edward Boyden (Ph.D.), co-inventor of optogenetics
Ronald N. Bracewell AO (Ph.D. 1949), Lewis M. Terman Professor of Electrical Engineering, pioneer of radio astronomy, designed and operated the spectroheliograph used to map the temperature of the sun for one cycle which was used during the NASA moon landing
Janet Zaph Briggs (A.B. 1931, M.S. 1933), metallurgist; first woman to earn a mining engineering degree at Stanford
Emmanuel Candès (Ph.D. 1998), professor in statistics at Stanford, the Alan T. Waterman Award winner
Cai Mingjie (Ph.D. 1990), molecular biologist; now driving a taxi in Singapore
John Chowning (Ph.D.), father of digital music synthesizer, inventor of frequency modulation (FM) algorithm
Francine Coeytaux, women's health worker and abortion rights activist
Eric Allin Cornell (B.S. 1985), Nobel Prize winner in physics
Merton Davies (B.S. 1937), space scientist
Kenneth L. Davis, president and chief executive officer of Mount Sinai Medical Center in New York City
Karl Deisseroth (Ph.D. 1998, M.D. 2000), neuroscientist, psychiatrist, and bioengineer; known for creating, developing, and applying the technologies of optogenetics and CLARITY, and for coining the names of these fields
Delzie Demaree (Ph.D 1932), botanist.
Thomas Dibblee, geologist
Ray Dolby (B.S. 1933), inventor of noise reduction system, winner of national medal of technology, inducted into National Inventors Hall of Fame
Charles Stark Draper (A.B. 1922), engineer and inventor, often called "the father of inertial navigation", inducted to the National Inventor Hall of Fame in 1981
Bradley Efron (Ph.D. 1960), a leading statistician, inventor of bootstrap sampling, 2005 National Medal of Science winner
Miquel Faig (Ph.D. 1986), economist
J. Doyne Farmer (B.S. physics 1973), Professor of Mathematics, Oxford University, co-founder of the Prediction Company
Katherine A. Flores (Human Biology, 1975) Professor at UCSF School of Medicine, Fresno, and founder of multiple programs to recruit, train, and retain LatinX doctors.
Jerome Friedman (postdoc), Nobel Prize winner in physics (1990)
Edray H. Goins (Ph.D. math 1999), president of the National Association of Mathematicians (NAM)
Ulysses S. Grant IV (Ph.D. 1929), geologist and paleontologist; grandson of President Ulysses S. Grant
Robert H. Grubbs (Postdoc), winner of the 2005 Nobel Prize in Chemistry
Theodor W. Hänsch (Postdoc and longtime faculty member), winner of the 2005 Nobel Prize in physics
John Harsanyi (Ph.D. 1959), 1972 Nobel Prize winner in economics
Dudley R. Herschbach (B.S. math, M.S. chem 1955), Nobel Prize winner in chemistry (1986)
Bengt R. Holmström (M.S. in operations research, Ph.D. in business), economist at MIT and Nobel Prize winner in economics (2016)
Taylor Howard (B.S. EE, former professor), father of home satellite TV dish, inventor of home satellite dish
Fazle Hussain (M.S. 1966, Ph.D. 1969), physicist; Cullen Distinguished Professor; Fluid Dynamics Award of AIAA, Fluid engineering Award of ASME and Fluid Dynamics Prize winner; member of US National Academy of Engineering and US National Research Council
Paul G. Kaminski (Ph.D. in AA, 1971), National Medal of Technology winner
David A. Karnofsky (A.M. 1936, M.D. 1940), medical oncologist known for the Karnofsky score
Henry Kendall (postdoc), Nobel Prize winner in physics (1990)
Paul W. Klipsch (M.S. 1934), high-fidelity audio pioneer
Roger D. Kornberg (Ph.D. 1972), winner of the 2006 Nobel Prize in Chemistry
Helena Chmura Kraemer (Ph.D. 1963), biostatistician
David Kreps (Ph.D.), winner of John Bates Clark Medal (2007) in economics
Stephen LaBerge (Ph.D. 1980),  psychophysiologist specializing in the scientific study of lucid dreaming
Esther Lederberg (A.M. 1946), pioneer of bacterial genetics; contributions include discovery of lambda phage, the transfer of genes between bacteria by specialized transduction, the development of replica plating, and the discovery of bacterial fertility factor F
Charles Lieber (Ph.D. 1985 Chem.), nanoscientist
Phil Ligrani (Ph.D. 1980), eminent scholar in propulsion and professor of mechanical and aerospace engineering at the University of Alabama in Huntsville
Mariangela Lisanti (Ph.D.), theoretical physicist
A. Louis London, professor of mechanical engineering, expert on heat exchange
Theodore Harold Maiman (MS in EE, Ph.D. in physics), inventor who built the first working laser, Japan Prize winner, Wolf Prize winner, inducted into the National Inventors Hall of Fame
Paul Milgrom (M.S. in statistics, Ph.D. in business), professor in economics at Stanford, Nobel Prize winner in economics (2020)
Paul L. Modrich (Ph.D. 1973), Nobel Prize winner in chemistry (2015)
Reed M. Nesbit (A.B. 1921, M.D. 1924), urologist, pioneer of transurethral resection of the prostate
Bradford Parkinson (Ph.D. 1966), inventor of Global Positioning System (GPS), inducted into National Inventors Hall of Fame
Kumar Patel (M.S., Ph.D., EE), inventor of carbon dioxide laser (the most widely used laser), IEEE medal of honor winner, National Medal of Science winner
Stephen Quake (M.S. 1991), professor of bioengineering and applied physics at Stanford, Lemelson–MIT Prize recipient, cofounder of Helicos Biosciences
Calvin Quate (Ph.D. 1950), inventor of the atomic force microscope, IEEE medal of honor winner
Bruce Reznick (Ph.D. 1976), mathematician noted for his contributions to number theory
Christina Riesselman, paleoceanographer researching Southern Ocean response to changing climate.
Alvin E. Roth (Ph.D. in operations research), 2012 Nobel prize winner in economics
Victor Scheinman (Ph.D.), inventor of programmable robot arm
Randy Schekman (Ph.D. in biochemistry), winner of 2002 Albert Lasker Award for Basic Medical Research, 2013 Nobel Prize winner in medicine 
Elba Serrano (Ph.D. 1982), neuroscientist and Regents professor of biology at New Mexico State University, recipient of Presidential Award for Excellence in Science, Mathematics, and Engineering Mentoring 
Oscar Elton Sette (B.S. Zoology 1922, Ph.D. Biology 1957), fisheries scientist, pioneer of fisheries oceanography and modern fisheries science
K. Barry Sharpless (Ph.D. 1965), two-time Nobel Prize winner in chemistry (2001 and 2022)
James Spudich (Ph.D. in chemistry), 2012 Lasker Award for 1980s discoveries related to biological motors
Max Steineke (AB 1921), chief geologist of CASOC responsible for the discovery of oil in Saudi Arabia
Nicholas B. Suntzeff (B.S. Mathematics 1974), cosmologist, Gruber Prize in Cosmology 2007, Breakthrough Prize in Fundamental Physics (2015)
Richard E. Taylor (Ph.D. 1962), Nobel Prize winner in physics (1990)
Frederick Terman (M.S. 1922), father of Silicon Valley, former professor in electrical engineering, National Medal of Science winner, IEEE medal of honor winner
Fred W. Turek, director of the Center for Sleep and Circadian Biology; Charles and Emma Morrison Professor of Biology in the Department of Neurobiology; both at Northwestern University
Michael S. Turner (Ph.D. 1978), cosmologist, professor of physics, University of Chicago, National Academy of Sciences
Ronald Vale (Ph.D. in neural science), 2012 Lasker Award for 1980s discoveries related to biological motors
Mac Van Valkenburg (Ph.D. 1952 EE), former dean of engineering college, UIUC
Oswald Garrison Villard Jr. (Ph.D., EE and longtime faculty), father of "over the horizon" radar
Grace Wahba (Ph.D. 1966), statistician, developed generalized cross-validation and formulated Wahba's problem
Brian Wansink (Ph.D. 1990), author of Mindless Eating: Why We Eat More Than We Think
Michael Webber (M.S. 1996, Ph.D. 2001), mechanical engineer and public speaker on energy policy
Carl Wieman (Ph.D. 1977), Nobel Prize winner in physics (2001)
Oliver Williamson (MBA, 1960), Nobel Prize winner in economics (2009)
Shing-Tung Yau, former faculty member, Fields Medal recipient

Arts and literature

Artists
Marguerite Blasingame, painter and sculptor
Barbara Bloemink, art historian, writer and expert on works on modernist painter Florine Stettheimer
Howell Chambers Brown (A.B. 1904), printmaker
Catherine Chalmers (B.S. 1979), artist and photographer
Robbie Conal (M.F.A.), artist
Margo Davis, photographer
Richard Diebenkorn, painter
Paulette Frankl, Arts and Languages, artist, courtroom artist and biographer
Dana Gioia (1973, MBA 1977), vice president at General Foods, poet, NEA chairman
Serena Ho, painter
Brad Howe, sculptor
Brenda Louie (M.F.A 1993)
Sanaz Mazinani (M.F.A. 2011), multidisciplinary artist
Robert Motherwell, painter
Chris Onstad, author and illustrator of popular webcomic Achewood
Kamau Amu Patton (M.F.A. 2007), multidisciplinary artist 
Kameelah Janan Rasheed, artist, educator, and writer
Shirley Russell, painter and educator

Film/television
Maudy Ayunda, actress and singer-songwriter
Laura Bialis, movie director
Richard Boone, actor
Andre Braugher, actor
David Brown, movie producer
Phil Brown, actor
Sterling K. Brown, actor
Frank Cady, actor
Britton Caillouette, filmmaker
Melanie Chandra (B.S. Mechanical Engineering 2006), actress, Code Black
Barney Cheng, actor, director, writer, producer
Jennifer Connelly, actress (dropped out)
Roger Corman, producer and director
Ted Danson, actor (transferred to Carnegie Mellon University)
Allison Fonte, former Mouseketeer from The New Mickey Mouse Club from the 1970s
Dana Fox, screenwriter
Jordan Gelber, actor
Nicholas Gonzalez, actor
Rebecca Hanover (B.A. English/creative writing 2001), television writer, winner of Daytime Emmy Award for her work on Guiding Light
Al Harrington (B.A. History 1958), actor, Hawaii Five-O
Ron Hayes, actor
Edith Head (A.M. Romance Languages, 1920), costume designer
Colin Higgins, film screenwriter, director, actor, and producer
Ollie Johnston, pioneering Disney animator
Jordan Kerner, film and television producer, former network and studio executive 
Don King (1978), surfing photographer and cinematographer
Yul Kwon, winner, Survivor: Cook Islands
Heather Langenkamp, actress
Robert Lehrer, actor
Warren Leight, Pulitzer Prize finalist, playwright, screenwriter, film director, television producer, best known for producing multiple Law & Order franchise series
Blake Masters, screenwriter, director, and producer
Alex Michel, businessman, producer, and television personality, best known for his role in The Bachelor
Avi Nash, actor
Lloyd Nolan (dropped out), actor
Safiya Nygaard, American YouTuber
Sharmeen Obaid-Chinoy, film director, director of two Academy Award-winning documentaries
Jack Palance, actor
Alexander Payne, film director
Danny Pintauro, actor
Rick Porras, movie producer
Megyn Price, actress
Issa Rae, actress, writer, director, producer
Alex Rich, actor
Edward L. Rissien, film producer
Jay Roach, film director
Skyler Samuels, actress
Ben Savage, actor
Fred Savage, actor
Susan Shadburne, film director, screenwriter
Sam Simon, television writer/producer
Eliel Swinton, actor
Cynthia Wade, documentary filmmaker
Kathryn Wallace, documentary filmmaker
Sigourney Weaver, actress
Adam West (dropped out), actor 
Reese Witherspoon (dropped out), actress
Hank Worden, actor
Alice Wu, writer and director of Saving Face
Richard Zanuck, movie producer

Journalism
Andy Adler, television personality, journalist
Gary Allen, journalist, author
Aimee Allison, author, public affairs television and radio host, political activist, and a leader of the counter-recruitment movement
Kris Atteberry, Twins Radio Network studio host
Kevin Bleyer, writer for The Daily Show with Jon Stewart
Ryan Blitstein, journalist
Gretchen Carlson, Fox & Friends
Rajiv Chandrasekaran, Washington Post editor and author
Bob Cohn, journalist
Richard Engel (1996), NBC reporter, author
Elizabeth Farnsworth (A.M.), broadcast journalist
Donna Hanover, radio and television news anchor and personality
Aljean Harmetz, journalist and film historian
Sally Jenkins (born 1960), author and sports journalist
Daryn Kagan, CNN ex-anchor
Ted Koppel (A.M.), journalist
Sharmeen Obaid-Chinay, journalist
Rachel Maddow, MSNBC, television host
Ty McCormick, award-winning American foreign correspondent 
Doyle McManus, Los Angeles Times bureau chief in Washington, D.C., author, broadcast commentator
Daniel Pearl, journalist
Nicholas Thompson, journalist
Jim Toomey, syndicated cartoonist
Pete Williams (A.B. 1974), NBC reporter, U.S. Assistant Secretary of Defense for Public Affairs (1989–1993)

Music
Samuel Adams, composer
Ronald Barnes (M.A. 1961), carillonist and musicologist
Allette Brooks, musician
Torry Castellano, former drummer of The Donnas
Jack Conte musician, popularized on YouTube, best known as member of Pomplamoose
Kristine Meredith Flaherty, rapper best known by her stage name K.Flay
Sameer Gadhia, lead singer of Young the Giant
Larry Grenadier, jazz bassist
Dave Guard, folk singer and songwriter
Tom Harrell, jazz trumpeter and composer
Jidenna, hip hop/R&B artist
Mikel Jollett, lead singer of The Airborne Toxic Event
Kylee, singer
Natalie Knutsen musician, popularized on YouTube, best known as member of Pomplamoose under the stage name Nataly Dawn
MC Lars, post-punk laptop rapper
Jon Nakamatsu, pianist
James Nash, musician
Bruce Robinson, singer/songwriter
Sandor Salgo, Carmel Bach Festival leader for 30 years
Anton Schwartz, jazz saxophonist
Daniel Seon Woong Lee, stage name Tablo (A.B. 2001, M.A. 2002)
Vienna Teng, musician
Christopher Tin, composer
Tim Westergren, co-founder of Pandora Media
Fei Xiang, singer

Writers

Ann Bannon (Ph.D. Linguistics), pulp fiction author
Elif Batuman (Ph.D. Comparative Literature), author of The Idiot and The Possessed
Brit Bennett (A.B. 2012), author
Stewart Brand, writer and editor
H. W. Brands (A.B. 1975), author and historian
Oscar Brockett, Theatre historian and scholar
Ethan Canin (A.B. 1982), author
Thad Carhart, author
Jorge Cham (Ph.D. 2003), author of the webcomic Piled Higher and Deeper
Victor Cheng (A.B, A.M.), author, blogger
Erskine Childers, author and United Nations official
Michael Cunningham, author
Simin Daneshvar (Ph.D., Stegner Fellow), Persian novelist and storywriter
Ram Dass (born Richard Alpert) (Ph.D. 1957), author, spiritual teacher 
Allen Drury (A.B. 1939), Pulitzer Prize-winning author
Selden Edwards (A.M. Education), best-selling novelist, headmaster, teacher
Carlos Fonseca Suárez (B.A. Comparative Literature), novelist
Allegra Goodman (Ph.D. English literature), novelist
Robin Lee Graham, Author, sailed the world alone as a teenager
Alexander Greendale (M.A.), playwright and civic leader.
Yaa Gyasi (A.B. English), Ghanaian-American novelist
David Harris (no degree), journalist, author, protester and anti-war activist
Sam Harris (A.B. 2000), author
Robert Hass (A.M., Ph.D.), U.S. Poet Laureate
George V. Higgins (A.M.), attorney and author
Douglas Hofstadter, Pulitzer Prize winner and author
bell hooks (A.B. 1973), writer on race, class, and gender
Mary-Louise Hooper (A.B. 1955), civil rights activist and journalist
David Henry Hwang (1979), playwright
Arturo Islas (A.B. 1960, A.M. 1965, Ph.D. 1971), fiction writer
Fenton Johnson (A.B., 1975, Stegner Fellow, 1985–86), author, fiction, nonfiction
Ken Kesey (A.M.), author
Iris Krasnow (A.B. 1976), author specializing in relationships and personal growth
Alan Lelchuk (Ph.D. 1965)
Paul Rogat Loeb (expelled for campus disruption), social and political activist and author
William Harjo LoneFight, Native American author and expert in the revitalization of Native American languages and cultural traditions
Dhan Gopal Mukerji, socio-cultural critic and author
Siddhartha Mukherjee (B.S. 1993), author, scientist and Pulitzer Prize winner
Michael Murphy, author and co-founder of Esalen Institute
Ted Nace (A.B. 1978), author noted for critique of corporate personhood
Scott O'Dell, author
Robert Pinsky (Ph.D.), U.S. Poet Laureate
Dick Price, co-founder of Esalen Institute
Chip Rawlins, non-fiction author, Stegner Fellow
Richard Rodriguez (A.B.), author; Hunger of Memory
Allen Rucker, writer and television producer
Edward Rutherfurd, novelist
Vikram Seth (dropped out of Ph.D. program), poet and author 
Curtis Sittenfeld, author
Anthony Veasna So (B.A. 2014), Cambodian-American short story writer
Joel Stein, humorist and columnist for the Los Angeles Times
John Steinbeck (dropped out), Nobel prize winner in literature
Gene Stone (A.B. 1973), author
Hans Otto Storm, novelist, radio engineer
Mark Sundeen, novelist and magazine writer
Bette Talvacchia (Ph.D. 1981), art historian
Nicholas Thompson, editor in chief of Wired and historian
Scott Turow (A.M.), author
Alok Vaid-Menon, poet
Jesmyn Ward (B.A., M.A.), author
Albert Wilson (M.S.), author, botanist, talk show personality
Tanaya Winder, poet
Tobias Wolff (A.M.), professor 1997–present, author
John Zerzan (A.B., 1965), anarchist and primitivist, author
Richard Zimler (A.M. 1982), author

Astronauts

Eileen Collins (M.S. 1986)
Mike Fincke (M.S.)
William Fisher
Owen Garriott (M.S., Ph.D.)
Susan Helms (M.S.)
Michael S. Hopkins (M.S.)
Mae Jemison (B.S., A.B.)
Tamara Jernigan (B.S., M.S.)
Gregory Linteris (M.S.)
Edward Lu (Ph.D.)
Bruce McCandless II (M.S.)
Barbara Radding Morgan
Kathleen Rubins (Ph.D.)
Ellen Ochoa (M.S., Ph.D.)
Scott Parazynski (B.S., M.D.)
Sally Ride (B.A., B.S., M.S., Ph.D.)
Stephen Robinson (M.S. 1985, Ph.D. 1990)
Steve Smith (B.S. 1981, M.S. 1982, MBA 1987)
Jeff Wisoff (M.S. 1982, Ph.D. 1986)

Business

Company founders

Brian Acton (B.S. 1994), co-founder of WhatsApp
Kurt Akeley (M.S. 1982, Ph.D. 2004), co-founder of Silicon Graphics
Michael Arrington (J.D., 1995), founder of TechCrunch
Diosdado Banatao (M.S.), venture capitalist; S3 Graphics, Chips and Technologies, Mostron co-founder.
David Baszucki (G.M., 1985), co-founder and CEO of Roblox
Andy Bechtolsheim (Ph.D. CS/EE 1977–1982 – dropped out), co-founder of Sun Microsystems 
Aneel Bhusri, cofounder of Workday
Len Bosack (M.S. 1981), co-founder of Cisco Systems with his girlfriend (later wife), Sandy Lerner
Dean Bosacki (MBA), co-founder of Manhattan Partners, board member of Academi
Sergey Brin (M.S.), Google co-founder 
Orkut Büyükkökten, founder of social networking service Orkut
Rachel Romer Carlson, founder and CEO of Guild Education
Tim Chen, co-founder and CEO of NerdWallet
Joe Coulombe, founder of Trader Joe's
James Coulter, cofounder of TPG Capital
Ray Dolby, audio engineer, founder of Dolby Labs
Tim Draper, venture capital investor
Helmy Eltoukhy (B.S., M.S., Ph.D.), co-founder and CEO of Avantome; co-founder and CEO of Guardant Health
Jessica Ewing co-founder, and CEO of Literati (book club)
Richard Fairbank (A.B., MBA), co-founder, chairman, and CEO of Capital One
David Filo (MS), Yahoo! co-founder 
Doris F. Fisher, co-founder of The Gap, Incorporated 
Tully Friedman, founder of Friedman Fleischer & Lowe, chairman of the board of trustees of the American Enterprise Institute
Victor Grinich (Ph.D. 1953), one of the "traitorous eight" who founded Fairchild Semiconductor
Andrew Grove (Lecturer), founder and former CEO and chairman of Intel
Prerna Gupta (B.A. 2004), founder of Khu.sh 
Ole Andreas Halvorsen (MBA 1990), co-founder of Viking Global Investors
Kevin Hartz, co-founder and CEO of Eventbrite
Reed Hastings (M.S. 1988), Netflix founder 
Trip Hawkins (MBA), founder of Electronic Arts, 3DO and Digital Chocolate
Gladys Heldman (MBA), founder of World Tennis and Virginia Slims Women's Tour
William Hewlett (1934), Hewlett-Packard co-founder 
Reid Hoffman, co-founder and executive chairman of LinkedIn
Elizabeth Holmes (dropped out), founder of Theranos
Jen Hsun Huang, co-founder of Nvidia
Jawed Karim, co-founder of YouTube
Stanley Kennedy Sr. (1912), Founder and Chairman of Hawaiian Airlines
Vinod Khosla (MBA), Sun Microsystems co-founder, Kleiner Perkins Caufield & Byers partner 
Phil Knight (MBA 1961), founder and former CEO, Nike
Mike Krieger, co-founder of Instagram
Sandy Lerner (M.S. Stat & CS 1981), co-founder of Cisco Systems with her boyfriend (later husband), Len Bosack
Richard Li (dropped out), founder of STAR TV (Asia) and chairman of the largest Hong Kong telecommunication carrier PCCW
Craig McCaw (A.B.), founder and CEO of McCaw Cellular, founder of Clearwire
Scott McNealy (MBA), co-founder, chairman, and former CEO of Sun Microsystems
Mark Oldman, Vault.com co-founder 
John Overdeck (B.S., M.S.), co-founder and co-chairman of Two Sigma
David Packard (1934), Hewlett-Packard co-founder 
Larry Page (M.S.), Google co-founder 
Azim Premji, founder and CEO of Wipro Technologies
T.J. Rodgers (Ph.D.), founder and CEO of Cypress Semiconductor
Blake Ross, Mozilla Firefox co-founder
Harry M. Rubin, co-founder of Samuel Adams and GT Interactive
James Sachs (A.M. 1979), IDEO co-founder 
Charles R. Schwab (1959, MBA 1961), founder, chairman, and CEO of Charles Schwab Corporation
David E. Shaw (Ph.D. 1980), founder of D.E. Shaw & Co.; Chief Scientist of D.E. Shaw Research, LLC 
Gary Shilling, financial analyst and commentator 
Jeffrey Skoll (MBA 1995), first president of eBay, founder of Participant Media
Evan Spiegel, co-founder of Snapchat
Tom Steyer, Farallon Capital founder 
Kevin Systrom, co-founder of Instagram
Peter Thiel, PayPal co-founder, Clarium Capital founder 
Alan Tripp (A.B. 1985, MBA 1989), founder of SCORE! Educational Centers and InsideTrack
Jerry Yang (b. 1968), Yahoo! co-founder 
Min Zhu (b. 1948), founder and former CTO of WebEx

Other entrepreneurs and business leaders
Jim Allchin (M.S.), co-president of Microsoft
Mukesh Ambani (MBA candidate, dropped out), Reliance Industries Limited Chairman
Chuck Armstrong (J.D. 1967), president of the Seattle Mariners
John Arrillaga (A.B., MBA), Silicon Valley real estate developer
Steven A. Ballmer (MBA candidate, dropped out in 1979), CEO of Microsoft
Mary Barra (MBA 1990), chair and CEO of General Motors (2014–present), first female CEO of a major automaker
Craig Barrett (B.S., Ph.D. 1964), past chairman of Intel, former CEO of Intel (1998–2005), former Stanford professor of materials science (1964–1974)
Jeffrey Bewkes (MBA 1977), Time Warner president and COO
Malin Burnham, American sailor, philanthropist, and businessman
R. Martin Chavez (Ph.D.), CFO of Goldman Sachs
Burton A. Dole, Jr. (BSME, MBA), president, CEO, and chairman of Puritan Bennett
Pat Dudley (B.A.), president and marketing director of Bethel Heights Vineyard
Carly Fiorina (1976), CEO of Hewlett-Packard 1999–2005
Paul Flaherty (M.S., Ph.D.), co-inventor of the AltaVista search engine
Steve Fossett (B.S.), businessman, aviator, sailor and adventurer; first person to circumnavigate the globe solo in a balloon
Bill Franke (B.A., 1959), chairman of Wizz Air and Frontier Airlines
Sarah Friar (MBA 2000), CEO of Nextdoor and former CFO of Block, Inc. (formerly Square)
Peter E. Haas Jr. (B.A., 1969), Levi Strauss executive
Christopher Hedrick (A.B. 1984), president and CEO of Intrepid Learning Solutions
John Hoke III (MBA), Chief Design Officer, Nike, Inc.
George H. Hume, president and CEO of Basic American Foods
Mamoru Imura, CEO of Vita Craft Corporation and Vita Craft Japan, inventor of RFIQin
Guy Kawasaki, venture capitalist
Kathryn Kennedy, winemaker, one of the first owners of a winery to bear a woman's name in California
Omid Kordestani (MBA), senior vice president of Google
Stephen D. Lebovitz (B.A. Political Science), CEO of CBL & Associates Properties
Victor Li (B.S., M.S. 1985), Hong Kong businessman
Mao Daolin (MS in EESOR), former CEO of Sina.com
Marissa Mayer (B.S. symbolic systems and M.S. computer science), CEO of Yahoo!
Stephen McLin (M.S. mechanical engineering, MBA), former Bank of America executive
Henry McKinnell (MBA, Ph.D.), chairman and former CEO of Pfizer
Robert Mondavi (A.B. 1937), vintner
John Morgridge (MBA 1957), Cisco Systems chairman
Hiroaki Nakanishi (M.S. 1979), president of Hitachi
Rodney O'Neal, president and chief executive officer of Delphi Automotive
Huw Pill (PhD, 1995), chief economist of the Bank of England
Stan Polovets (MBA, 1989), energy executive and philanthropist
Ruth Porat, CFO of Alphabet, Inc./Google, Inc.; former CFO of Morgan Stanley
Kirthiga Reddy, former managing director at Facebook India
John Turner Sargent, Jr., business associate of Doubleday (whose father was CEO) and CEO of Holtzbrinck Publishing Group
Fred Swaniker (MBA 2004), African entrepreneur and educator
Aaron Swartz (dropped out), computer-programmer-turned-political-activist, co-founder of reddit
Alan J. Viergutz, chairman of Grupo Centec and former president of the Venezuelan Oil Chamber
David Wehner, CFO of Facebook, 2014–present
Darryl Willis (M.S. 2007), BP vice president of claims featured in commercials in the Deepwater Horizon oil spill
David B. Yoffie, business author

Religion
 Robert W. McElroy, M.A. 1976, Ph.D. 1989, American Roman Catholic Cardinal designate, sixth bishop of the Roman Catholic Diocese of San Diego
 Katharine Jefferts Schori, B.S. 1974, presiding bishop of the Episcopal Church in the United States (2006–2015)
 Gene Scott, Ph.D. 1957, pastor, religious broadcaster
 Bill Thompson, B.A., 1968, bishop of the Diocese of Western Anglicans

Miscellaneous

David A. Aaker, consultant and author on Marketing
Scott D. Anderson, Air National Guard F-16 pilot and general aviation test pilot, successfully flight tested first deployment of a whole-plane parachute recovery system
Alexandra Botez (B.A. 2017), chess player and commentator
Antonio Buehler (M.B.A. 2006), West Point graduate and veteran of Kosovo and Iraq turned civil-rights leader battling police corruption
T. Brian Callister, M.D. (A.B. 1983), physician, health care policy expert
Auburn Calloway, attempted hijacker
William George Carr, executive secretary of the National Education Association 1952–1967
Chelsea Clinton (A.B. 2001), First Daughter of the United States
Jeff Cooper, a United States Marine Corps veteran of World War II and the Korean War, considered the creator of the "modern technique" of handgun shooting
Diego Cordovez (A.B., M.S.), World Series of Poker Champion
Ben Yu, poker player, World Series of Poker bracelet winner
Jan Crull Jr. (enrollee and dropout, summer quarter 1967), former Native American Rights activist, iconoclastic filmmaker and multiple Marquis Who's Who biographee; first proposed the need for an Indian college fund as an aide to U.S. Congressman Paul Simon
 Peter Dalglish, international children's rights advocate; founded Toronto-based Street Kids International (SKI)
 Clifford B. Drake (A.M. 1951), Marine Corps Major general
 Paul Draper, winemaker at Ridge Vineyards
Ann B. Friedman, founder, Planet Word, a museum of language arts in Washington, D.C.
 Patri Friedman, software engineer at Google
 John D. Goldman (M.B.A. 1975), CEO, Richard N. Goldman & Co. Insurance Services; president, San Francisco Symphony
 Ari Greenberg, world junior bridge champion
 Harry Hay (1934, dropped out), founder of the gay liberation movement
 Denis Hayes (A.B. 1969, J.D. 1985), environmental activist and coordinator of the first Earth Day
 Carol F. Henry, philanthropist; co-founder and president of the Los Angeles Opera
 Lou Henry Hoover, First Lady of the United States
 Soren Johnson (A.B., M.S.), video-game designer
 William G. Joslyn (B.A. 1943), Major general in the Marine Corps
 Crystal Lee, Miss California 2013, First Runner-Up Miss America 2014
 Harold Levitt, architect
 John A. Macready (1912), aviator, member of the National Aviation Hall of Fame and the only three-time winner of the Mackay Trophy
 Ximena McGlashan (1916), entomologist, butterfly farmer
 Maura McNiel, supporter of feminism and women's rights
 Gregory Minor (M.S. 1966), one of three middle-management engineers who resigned from the General Electric nuclear reactor division in 1976 to protest against the use of nuclear power in the United States, an event which galvanized anti-nuclear groups across the country
 Ann O'Leary (A.M. 1997), senior policy advisor, Hillary Clinton presidential campaign, 2016; chief of staff to California Governor Gavin Newsom
 Charles A. Ott, Jr. (1941), United States Army major general and director of the Army National Guard
 James Rucker (B.S., 1991), co-founder of Color of Change
 Eunice Kennedy Shriver, founder of Special Olympics, sister of John F. Kennedy (1944)
 William Shurtleff, researcher, writer, historian, bibliographer, and popularizer of soyfoods
 Paul Sohl, United States Navy Rear Admiral
 Piya Sorcar, founder and CEO, TeachAids
 Vanessa Southern, Unitarian minister and progressive advocate
 Walter A. Starr, Jr., mountaineer (1924)
 Theodore Streleski, murderer of Stanford professor Karel deLeeuw in 1978
 Gayle Wilson (A.B. 1964), First Lady of California
 John C. Young (B.S., 1936, Engineer Degree, 1937), San Francisco Chinatown business and community leader.
 John Zerzan, green anarchist philosopher

Sports
Viraat Badhwar, Indian Australian golfer

Politics

Presidents, Vice Presidents, and Prime Ministers

Royalty

Cabinet Secretaries/Ministers

U.S. Senators

Members of the U.S. House of Representatives

Governors

U.S. ambassadors

Other U.S. diplomats

Lieutenant Governors

U.S. Statewide officials other than Governors/Lieutenant Governors

California State Legislators
Juan Arambula (A.M. 1978), former California State Assemblyman
Josh Becker (J.D. 1998, M.B.A. 1998), California State Senator
Wilma Chan (A.M. 1994), former California State Assembly Majority Leader
Richard J. Dolwig (LL.M. 1938), former California State Senator
Nolan Frizzelle, former California State Assemblyman
Lorena Gonzalez (A.B. 1993), California State Assemblywoman
Gary K. Hart (A.B. 1965), former California State Senator
Barry Keene (A.B. 1962, LL.B. 1964), former California State Senator
Sally J. Lieber (A.B. 2000), former California State Assemblywoman
Michael Machado (A.B. 1970), former California State Senator
Milton Marks (A.B. 1941), former California State Senator
George W. Milias (A.M. 1950), former California State Assemblyman
Becky Morgan (M.B.A. 1978), former California State Senator
Robert W. Naylor (A.B. 1966), former California State Assembly Minority Leader
Nicholas C. Petris (LL.B. 1949), former California State Senator
Curren Price (A.B. 1972), Los Angeles City Councilman and former California State Senator
Albert S. Rodda (A.B. 1933, Ph.D. 1951), former California State Senator
Ira Ruskin (A.M. 1983), former California State Assemblyman
Alan Sieroty (A.B. 1952), former California State Senator
Joe Simitian (A.M. 2000), former California State Senator
Robert S. Stevens (A.B. 1939, LL.B. 1942), former California State Senator
William A. Sutherland (A.B. 1895, LL.B. 1898), former California State Assemblyman

U.S. State Legislators outside California
Tom Adelson (A.B. 1988), former Oklahoma State Senator
Mary Kay Becker (A.B. 1966), former Washington State Representative
Andy Berke (A.B. 1990), Mayor of Chattanooga, Tennessee and former Tennessee State Senator
Julie Bunn (A.M. 1985, Ph.D. 1993), former Minnesota State Representative
Brian Bushweller (A.M. 1970), Delaware State Senator
Capri Cafaro (A.B. 1996), former Ohio State Senate Minority Leader
Charles Coiner (A.B. 1965), former Idaho State Senator
William A. Collins (M.B.A. 1959), former Connecticut State Representative and Mayor of Norwalk, Connecticut
Eric Croft (B.S. 1986), former Alaska State Representative
Andy Fleischmann (A.M. 1989), Connecticut State Representative
Mary Alice Ford (A.B. 1956), former Oregon State Representative
Jon Hecht (A.B. 1981), Massachusetts State Representative
Beth Kerttula (A.B. 1978), former Alaska House Minority Leader
Patricia Lantz (A.B. 1960), former Washington State Representative
Stephen R. Leopold (A.B. 1966), former Wisconsin State Assemblyman
Brandon Shaffer (A.B. 1993), former president of the Colorado State Senate
Cynthia Thielen, Hawaii State Representative
Peter Wirth (A.B. 1984), New Mexico State Senate Majority Leader

Other non-U.S. political officials
Diana Buttu (J.S.M. 2000, J.S.D. 2008), Palestinian political advisor
Menzies Campbell, British Liberal Democrat Leader (2006–2007)
Lena Kolarska-Bobińska (post-doctoral fellow in 1974–1976), a Polish Member of the European Parliament (2009–present)
John Lipsky (M.A., Ph.D.), acting managing director (CEO), International Monetary Fund, 2011; first deputy managing director (second-in-command, IMF, 2006–11
Syed Murad Ali Shah, Chief Minister of Sindh, Pakistan (2016–present)
Michael Stephen (J.S.M. 1971), member of Parliament of the United Kingdom (1992–1997)
Martti Tiuri (M.S. 1956), member of Parliament of Finland (1983–2003)
Daria Zarivna - is a Ukrainian presidential adviser, social activist, spokeswoman and entrepreneur

Other U.S. political officials
Christine Abizaid (M.A. 2010), 7th Director of the U.S. National Counterterrorism Center (2021–present)
Jaime Areizaga-Soto (A.M. 1994, J.D. 1994), 11th U.S. Chairman of the Board of Veterans' Appeals (2022–present)
Kurt DelBene (M.S. 1983), U.S. Assistant Secretary of Veterans Affairs for Information and Technology and Chief Information Officer
Lawrence Clayton (A.B. 1914), member of the board of governors of the U.S. Federal Reserve System (1947–1949)
Gabe Camarillo (J.D. 2002), 35th United States Under Secretary of the Army (2022–present)
Stacey Dixon (B.S. 1993), 6th U.S. Principal Deputy Director of National Intelligence (2021–present)
Richard W. Fisher (M.B.A. 1975), president of the Federal Reserve Bank of Dallas
Glen Fukushima (A.B. 1972), deputy assistant United States Trade Representative (1988–1990)
Matt Gonzalez (J.D. 1990), president of the San Francisco Board of Supervisors (2003–2005)
Casey Gwinn, San Diego City Attorney (1996–2004)
Wilder W. Hartley, Los Angeles City Councilman (1939–1941)
John C. Holland, Los Angeles City Councilman (1943–1967)
Keith Hennessey (B.A.S. 1990), 7th director of the U.S. National Economic Council (2007–2009)
Valerie Jarrett (A.B. 1978), senior advisor to U.S. President Barack Obama (2009–2017)
Kristina M. Johnson (B.S. 1979, M.S. 1981, Ph.D. 1984), U.S. Undersecretary of Energy (2009–2010), 16th president of Ohio State University (2020–present) and provost of Johns Hopkins University (2007–2009)
Kalpana Kotagal (A.B. 1999, B.S. 1999), employment attorney and U.S. Equal Employment Opportunity Commissioner-designate
Caroline D. Krass (A.B. 1989), General Counsel of the Department of Defense (2021–present)
Kathleen Matthews (A.B. 1975), Chair of the Maryland Democratic Party (2017–2018)
Steven W. Mosher (A.M. 1977, A.M. 1978), Commissioner, Commission on Broadcasting to the People's Republic of China (1991–1992)
Gautam Raghavan (B.A. 2004), director of the White House Presidential Personnel Office (2022–present)
Bob Ronka, Los Angeles City Councilman (1977–1981)
Catherine Sandoval (J.D. 1990), California Public Utilities Commissioner (2011–2017)
Vice Admiral James Stockdale (A.M. 1962), independent U.S. Vice Presidential candidate in the 1992 presidential election with Ross Perot and the highest-ranking naval officer held as a prisoner of war in Vietnam
Michael Tubbs (B.A. 2012, M.A. 2012), 79th Mayor of Stockton, California (2017–2021)
Carmen Vali-Cave (A.B. 1987), Ph.D. 1994), first mayor of Aliso Viejo, California
Kevin Warsh (A.B. 1992), member of the board of governors of the U.S. Federal Reserve System (2006–2011)
Jared Weinstein (M.B.A. 2011), special assistant and personal aide to U.S. President George W. Bush (2006–2009)
Pete Williams (A.B. 1974), NBC reporter, U.S. Assistant Secretary of Defense for Public Affairs (1989–1993)
Girmay Zahilay (B.A. 2009), King County Councilman (2020–present)

Law

National supreme court justices

U.S. federal Ninth Circuit Court of Appeals judges

U.S. federal court of appeals judges outside the Ninth Circuit

U.S. federal district court judges for the Northern District of California

U.S. federal district court judges in California outside the Northern District

U.S. federal district court judges outside California

U.S. state supreme court chief justices

California supreme court associate justices

U.S. state supreme court associate justices outside California

California Second District Court of Appeal justices

California court of appeal justices outside the second district
Cynthia Aaron (A.B. 1979), Associate Justice of the California Fourth District Court of Appeal, Division One (2003–present)
George A. Brown (LL.B. 1948), Presiding Justice of the California Fifth District Court of Appeal (1972–1987); Associate Justice (1971–1972)
Dennis A. Cornell (A.B. 1969), Associate Justice of the California Fifth District Court of Appeal (2000–2015)
Christopher Cottle (A.B. 1962), Presiding Justice of the California Sixth District Court of Appeal (1993–2001); Associate Justice (1988–1993)
Thomas F. Crosby, Jr. (A.B. 1962), Associate Justice of the California Fourth District Court of Appeal, Division Three (1982–2001)

Elena J. Duarte (J.D. 1992), Associate Justice of the California Third District Court of Appeal (2010–present)
Daniel J. Kremer (A.B. 1960, LL.B. 1963), Presiding Justice of the California Fourth District Court of Appeal, Division One (1985–2003)
James A. McIntyre (LL.B. 1963), Associate Justice of the California Fourth District Court of Appeal, Division One (1996–2016)
Fred R. Pierce (A.B. 1921), Presiding Justice of the California Third District Court of Appeal (1962–1971); Associate Justice (1961–1962)
Stuart R. Pollak (A.B. 1959), Presiding Justice of the California First District Court of Appeal, Division Four (2018–present); Associate Justice of the First District, Division Three (2002–2018)
Richard M. Sims, Jr. (A.B. 1931), Associate Justice of the California First District Court of Appeal, Division One (1964–1978)

U.S. state appellate court judges outside California
Mary Kay Becker (A.B. 1966), Judge of the Washington Court of Appeals, Division I (1994–2019)
C. C. Bridgewater (A.B. 1966), Judge of the Washington Court of Appeals, Division II (1994–2010)
Peter Eckerstrom (J.D. 1986), Chief Judge of the Arizona Court of Appeals, Division Two (2014–2019); Judge of the Arizona Court of Appeals, Division Two (2003–2014; 2019–present)
Rick Haselton (A.B. 1976), Chief Judge of the Oregon Court of Appeals (2012–2015); Judge of the Oregon Court of Appeals (1994–2012)
Diane Johnsen (J.D. 1982), Judge of the Arizona Court of Appeals, Division One (2006–2020)
David Schuman (A.B. 1966), Judge of the Oregon Court of Appeals (2001–2014)
William A. Thorne Jr. (J.D. 1977), Judge of the Utah Court of Appeals (2000–2013)
Robert Y. Thornton (A.B. 1932), Judge of the Oregon Court of Appeals (1971–1983)

U.S. Department of Justice
David L. Anderson (J.D. 1990), United States Attorney for the Northern District of California (2019–2021)
Donald B. Ayer (A.B. 1971), 24th United States Deputy Attorney General (1989–1990)
Nathan Hochman (J.D. 1988), United States Assistant Attorney General for the Tax Division (2008–2009)
Carol Lam (J.D. 1985), United States Attorney for the Southern District of California (2002–2007)
Ronald Machen (A.B. 1991), United States Attorney for the District of Columbia (2010–2015)
Jeffrey A. Taylor (A.B. 1987), interim United States Attorney for the District of Columbia (2006–2009)

Other
Luke Cole (A.B. 1984), environmental lawyer, co-founder of the Center on Race, Poverty and the Environment
William Kaplan (J.S.D. 1988), lawyer, arbitrator, law professor, author
Larry Krasner (J.D. 1987), 26th District Attorney of Philadelphia (2018–present)
Michael Nava (J.D. 1981), lawyer; frequent speaker and writer on the need to open the legal profession to traditionally underrepresented groups including people of color, gay, lesbian, bisexual and transgender people, women and people with disabilities
Neil Papiano (A.B. 1956, A.M. 1957), attorney for President Ronald Reagan, Elizabeth Taylor, Walter Matthau
Robert Philibosian (A.B. 1962), 38th District Attorney of Los Angeles County, California
Anthony Romero (J.D. 1990), first openly gay man and first Latino director of the American Civil Liberties Union
Marc Rotenberg (J.D. 1987), president and executive director of the Electronic Privacy Information Center
J. Tony Serra (A.B. 1957), radical civil rights attorney

Stanford faculty and affiliates

Aeronautics and astronautics
Sigrid Close, Associate Professor, Aeronautics and Astronautics; Electrical Engineering
 William F. Durand, Professor, Aeronautics and Astronautics; Mechanical Engineering; Electrical Engineering (1859–1958)
 Charbel Farhat, Professor, Aeronautics and Astronautics; Mechanical Engineering
 G. Scott Hubbard, Adjunct Professor, Aeronautics and Astronautics
 Antony Jameson, Emeritus Faculty, Aeronautics and Astronautics
 Sanjay Lall, Professor, Aeronautics and Astronautics; Electrical Engineering
 Bradford Parkinson, Professor Emeritus, Aeronautics and Astronautics
 Stephen Rock, Professor, Aeronautics and Astronautics
 Debbie Senesky, Assistant Professor, Aeronautics and Astronautics; Electrical Engineering
 George Springer, Emeritus Faculty, Aeronautics and Astronautics

Biology/biochemistry/medicine

 George W. Beadle, professor of biology, co-winner of 1958 Nobel Prize in Physiology or Medicine (at Caltech at time of award)
 Paul Berg, emeritus (active) professor of biochemistry, co-winner of 1980 Nobel Prize in Chemistry, pioneer in recombinant DNA technology
 David Botstein, former professor of genetics, pioneer in Human Genome Project
 Patrick O. Brown, professor of biochemistry, inventor of DNA microarray technology
 Eugene C. Butcher, professor of pathology, 2004 Crafoord Prize winner
 Stanley Norman Cohen, professor of genetics and medicine, accomplished the first transplantation of genes between cells; winner of National Medal of Science, National Medal of Technology, inducted into National Inventors Hall of Fame
 Carl Degler, professor of history, Pulitzer Prize for History (1972)
 William C. Dement, professor of psychiatry and behavioral sciences, pioneer in sleep research
 Christian Guilleminault, professor of psychiatry and behavioral sciences, pioneer in sleep research
 Paul R. Ehrlich, professor of biology, 1990 Crafoord Prize winner
 James Ferrell, systems biologist and the first chair of the Dept. of Chemical and Systems Biology from its establishment until 2011
 Andrew Z. Fire, professor of genetics and pathology, winner of the 2006 Nobel Prize in Physiology or Medicine
 Thomas J. Fogarty, clinical professor of surgery; member of National Inventors Hall of Fame; owner of more than 100 surgical patents, including the Fogarty balloon catheter
 Toby Freedman Space Medicine
 Jessica Hellmann, professor of ecology at the University of Minnesota, director of the Institute on the Environment
 Daniel Herschlag, senior associate dean at Stanford University School of Medicine, graduate education and postdoctoral affairs and professor of biochemistry and, by courtesy, of chemistry
 Leonard Herzenberg, professor of genetics, winner of Kyoto Prize for development of fluorescent-activated cell sorting
 Andrew D. Huberman, professor of Neurobiology and Ophthalmology, known for discoveries of brain function, plasticity and regeneration
David Katzenstein, virologist and AIDS researcher and associate medical director of the AIDS Clinical Trial Unit at Stanford
 Robert Kerlan Sports Medicine pioneer
 Peter S. Kim, professor of biochemistry, former president of Merck Research Laboratories (MRL), 2003–2013
 Brian Kobilka, professor in medical school, 2012 Nobel Prize winner in chemistry
 Arthur Kornberg, professor of biochemistry, winner of 1959 Nobel Prize in Physiology or Medicine
 Roger D. Kornberg, professor of structural biology, winner of 2006 Nobel Prize in Chemistry
 William Langston, neurologist; founder, CEO, and scientific director of the Parkinson's Institute
 Joshua Lederberg, founder of the Stanford Department of Genetics, co-recipient of 1958 Nobel Prize in Physiology or Medicine
 Michael Levitt, professor in medical school, 2013 Nobel prize winner in chemistry
 Kate Lorig, chronic disease self-management, patient education, director of the Stanford Patient Education Center
 Nicole Martinez-Martin, assistant professor of biomedical ethics,ethics of AI and digital health,STS
 José Gilberto Montoya, professor in medical school, founder of the Immunocompromised Host Service
 Peter Raven, professor of botany; coauthor with Paul Ehrlich in 1964 of the seminal work Butterflies and Plants: A Study in Coevolution; Missouri Botanical Garden, 1971–2010; board of trustees of National Geographic; International Prize for Biology, 1986; Pontifical Science Academy; Time Magazine "Hero for the Planet" 1999
 Robert Sapolsky, John A. and Cynthia Fry Gunn Professor in Biological Sciences, Neurology & Neurological Sciences, and Neurosurgery; author and recipient of awards including MacArthur Fellowship genius grant, an Alfred P. Sloan Fellowship, and the Klingenstein Fellowship in Neuroscience
 Matthew P. Scott, professor of developmental biology, discoverer of homeobox genes
 Oscar Elton Sette, lecturer and Chief of Ocean Research, pioneer of fisheries oceanography and modern fisheries science
 Norman Shumway, professor at Stanford Medical School, father of the heart transplantation technique
 Lubert Stryer, professor of biology, 2006 National Medal of Science winner, known for micro-array gene chip
 Thomas Sudhof, professor at Stanford Medical School, winner of 2013 Nobel Prize in Physiology or Medicine
 Edward L. Tatum, co-winner of 1958 Nobel Prize in Physiology or Medicine (at Rockefeller Institute for Medical Research at time of award)
 Jared Tinklenberg, professor of psychiatry and behavioral sciences
 Donald Redelmeier, internist, Professor of Medicine at University of Toronto, noted expert in medical decision making

Chemistry
 Carolyn R. Bertozzi, professor of chemistry, winner of 2022 Nobel Prize in Chemistry
 Carl Djerassi, professor emeritus in chemistry; father of birth control pill; winner of National Medal of Science, National Medal of Technology, and Wolf Prize; inducted into National Inventors Hall of Fame
 Paul Flory, former professor of chemistry, winner of 1974 Nobel Prize in Chemistry
 William Johnson, former professor in chemistry, National Medal of Science winner
 Harden M. McConnell, professor emeritus in chemistry, National Medal of Science winner
 Vijay S. Pande, associate professor in the Chemistry Department, founder of Folding@home distributed computing project
 Linus Pauling, former professor in chemistry, Nobel prize winner in Chemistry (1954) and in Peace (1962)
 John Ross, professor emeritus in chemistry, National Medal of Science winner
 Henry Taube, former professor in chemistry, winner of 1983 Nobel Prize in Chemistry
 Richard Zare, professor in chemistry, winner of National Medal of Science and Wolf Prize

Graduate School of Business
 Edward Lazear, former chairman of the Council of Economic Advisers (2006–2009); professor, Graduate School of Business; Hoover Fellow

Communication
 Clifford Nass, co-creator of The Media Equation theory of human-computer interaction
 Darwin Teilhet, mystery novelist, taught journalism at Stanford

Computer science

 Vinton Cerf, former faculty, Turing Award-winning computer scientist
 Douglas Engelbart, Turing award-winning computer scientist, inventor of the computer mouse, former researcher, inducted into National Inventors Hall of Fame
 Edward Feigenbaum, Turing award-winning computer scientist, father of expert system, coinventor of Dendral
 Robert Floyd, former faculty, Turing award-winning computer scientist
 Alexandra Illmer Forsythe, wrote the first series of introductory computer science textbooks
 George Forsythe, founder of the Department of Computer Science and president of the Association for Computing Machinery
 Gene Golub, former faculty, a leading authority in numerical matrix analysis, inventor of the algorithm for Singular Value Decomposition (SVD)
 David Gries, former faculty. First text on compilers, winner of four national education awards
 Leonidas J. Guibas, Allan Newell award-winning pioneer in data structures and geometric algorithms
 John L. Hennessy, pioneer in RISC, president of Stanford
 Sir Antony Hoare, former faculty, Turing award-winning computer scientist
 John Hopcroft, former faculty, Turing award-winning computer scientist
 Alan Kay, former faculty, Turing award-winning computer scientist
 Donald Knuth, professor emeritus, computer science pioneer, creator of TeX, author of The Art of Computer Programming, Turing award winner
 Daphne Koller, professor in CS
 John Koza, pioneer in genetic programming
 Barbara Liskov, first woman to earn a Ph.D. in CS from Stanford, Turing award-winning computer scientist
 John McCarthy, responsible for the coining of the term Artificial Intelligence, and inventor of the Lisp programming language and time sharing, Turing award winner
 Edward McCluskey, professor in EE, IEEE John Von Neumann Prize winner
 Robert Metcalfe, former faculty, co-inventor of Ethernet, inducted into National Inventors Hall of Fame
 Robin Milner former faculty, Turing award-winning computer scientist
 Allen Newell Turing award-winning computer scientist
 Andrew Ng, faculty in CS, winner of 2010 IJCAI Computers and Thought Award
 John Ousterhout, faculty in CS, winner of Grace Murray Hopper Award
 Amir Pnueli postdoc, Turing award-winning computer scientist
 Raj Reddy, former faculty, Turing award-winning computer scientist
 Ronald Rivest former faculty, Turing award-winning computer scientist
 Tim Roughgarden, faculty in CS, winner of Grace Murray Hopper Award
 Arthur Samuel, former faculty; pioneer in the field of computer gaming and artificial intelligence; his checkers-playing program appears to be the world's first self-learning program, and an early demonstration of the fundamental concept of artificial intelligence (AI)
 Dana Scott, former faculty, Turing award-winning computer scientist
 Robert Tarjan, former faculty, Turing award-winning computer scientist
 Sebastian Thrun, director of Stanford AI LAB; team leader of Stanford driverless car racing team, whose entry Stanley won the 2005 DARPA grand challenge
 Jeff Ullman, professor in CS, IEEE John Von Neumann prize winner
 Terry Winograd, faculty in CS, winner of 2010 IJCAI Computers and Thought Award
 Niklaus Wirth former faculty, Turing award-winning computer scientist, inventor of PASCAL
 Andrew Yao, former faculty, Turing award-winning computer scientist
 William Yeager, inventor of multi-protocol internet router

Economics
 Kenneth J. Arrow, Nobel Prize-winning economics professor
 Gary Becker, Nobel Prize-winning economics professor, Hoover Institution
 Ben Bernanke, Chairman of the United States Federal Reserve
 Gérard Debreu, Nobel Prize winner in economics, former staff
 Milton Friedman, Nobel Prize-winning economics professor, Hoover Institution
 Francisco Gil Díaz, economist, former Secretary of Finance of Mexico
 Avner Greif, economist
 Caroline Hoxby, professor of economics
 Ro Khanna, visiting lecturer of economics (2012–2016), deputy assistant secretary in the United States Department of Commerce (2009–2011), U.S. Congressman (2017–present)
 Jonathan Levin, professor of economics, won the 2011 John Bates Clark Medal
 Paul Milgrom, Nobel Prize-winning economics professor, Hoover fellow
 Douglass North, Nobel Prize-winning economics professor, Hoover Institution
 Paul Romer, Nobel Prize-winning economics professor
 Alvin E. Roth, Nobel prize-winning economics professor
 Myron Scholes, Nobel Prize-winning economics professor
 William F. Sharpe, professor emeritus, School of Business, Nobel prize winner
 Thomas Sowell, economist and popular author, senior fellow at the Hoover Institution
 Michael Spence, professor emeritus, School of Business, Nobel prize winner in economics
 Joseph Stiglitz, professor emeritus, School of Business, Nobel prize winner in economics
 John B. Taylor, economist, Hoover Fellow, developed the Taylor rule, Under Secretary of the Treasury for International affairs
 Robert B. Wilson, Nobel Prize-winning economics professor

Education
 Margaret Lee Chadwick, headmistress and founder of the Chadwick School and author
 William Damon, pioneer in peer collaboration and project-based learning
 Linda Darling-Hammond, education advisor to Barack Obama's presidential campaign
 Nathaniel Gage, pioneer in the scientific understanding of teaching
 Richard Wall Lyman, former provost of Stanford University
 Fred Swaniker, co-founder of African Leadership Academy, CEO and co-founder of African Leadership University
 Lewis Terman, creator of the Stanford Binet IQ test
 John Willinsky, Open Access educator, activist and author

Engineering
 Andreas Acrivos, former professor, National Medal of Science winner
 Stephen Barley, organizational theorist and developer of adaptive structuration, co-director of the Center for Work, Technology, and Organization
 Sally Benson, professor of engineering
 Arthur E. Bryson, Jr., professor emeritus in Aeronautics and Astronautics, father of modern optimal control theory
 Roland Doré, former president of the Canadian Space Agency
 William F. Durand, professor and head of Mechanical Engineering (1904–24), aerodynamics pioneer and chair of NASA forerunner NACA
 Irmgard Flügge-Lotz, pioneer of discontinuous automatic control theory
 William Webster Hansen, former professor, contributed to the development of microwave technology
 Siegfried Hecker, professor, former director of Los Alamos National Lab
 Ronald A. Howard, professor, father of decision analysis, founding director and former chairman of Strategic Decision Group
 Mark Z. Jacobson, professor of engineering
 Elizabeth Jens, NASA engineer
 Rudolf Kálmán, former professor in EE, the father of modern control theory, noted for Kalman filter, National Medal of Science winner
 Rudolf Kompfner, former professor, National Medal of Science winner
 Bruce Lusignan, emeritus professor of electrical engineering, made contributions to communication satellites and reusable launch vehicles
 Bridgette Meinhold, artist and author with a focus on sustainability
 Dwight Nishimura, Addie and Al Macovski professor in the School of Engineering, who leads the Magnetic Resonance Systems Research Laboratory
 William Perry (A.M. 1950), engineer, entrepreneur, diplomat, and 19th Secretary of Defense of the United States
 Calvin Quate, professor, National Medal of Science winner
 Paul V. Roberts, pioneer of environmental engineering
 Stephen Timoshenko, pioneer of modern engineering mechanics
 Powtawche Valerino, NASA JPL space navigation engineer
 Giovanni De Micheli, former professor of Electrical Engineering
 Teresa Meng, Reid Weaver Dennis Professor of Electrical Engineering

History
 Thomas A. Bailey, professor of history, former Organization of American Historians president, former Society for Historians of American Foreign Relations president, author of numerous books on diplomatic history and the widely used textbook The American Pageant* Captain Edward L. Beach, Sr., USN (ret.), professor of military and naval history
 Bipan Chandra, emeritus professor of history, Jawaharlal Nehru University, New Delhi and chairman, National Book Trust, New Delhi
 Don E. Fehrenbacher, Pulitzer Prize winner author (1979, The Dred Scott Case: Its Significance in American Law & Politics); William Robertson Coe Professor of History and American Studies from 1953
 Paula Findlen, professor of history of science 
 David M. Kennedy, professor of history and Pulitzer Prize-winning author
 Mark Edward Lewis, Kwoh-Ting Li Professor of Chinese Culture
 Sabine G. MacCormack, award-winning professor of late antique history
 Aron Rodrigue, historian
 Londa Schiebinger, professor of history of science
 James J. Sheehan, professor of history and former American Historical Association president
 Payson J. Treat (Ph.D. 1910), professor of Far Eastern history
 Gordon Wright, professor of history, former American Historical Association president

International relations
 Stephen D. Krasner, former director of policy planning (2005–2007) for the United States Department of State

Law
 Benjamin Harrison, constitutional and international law professor and 23rd President of the United States
 William Lerach, guest lecturer on securities and corporate law
 Lawrence Lessig, IP and constitutional law professor
 Richard Posner, associate professor and Chief Judge of the United States Court of Appeals for the Seventh Circuit

Linguistics
 Jared Bernstein, Adjunct Professor
 Eve V. Clark, Richard Lyman Professor in the Humanities, Emerita
 Michael C. Frank, associate professor of psychology and, by courtesy, of linguistics
 Miyako Inoue, associate professor of anthropology and, by courtesy, of linguistics
 Dan Jurafsky, professor of linguistics and of computer science, and chair, Department of Linguistics
 Ronald M. Kaplan, Adjunct Professor
 Lauri Karttunen, Adjunct Professor
 Martin Kay, professor of linguistics
 Paul Kay, Adjunct Professor
 Paul V. Kiparsky, Anne T. and Robert M. Bass Professor in the School of Humanities and Sciences
 Beth Levin, William H. Bonsall Professor in the Humanities
 Jay McClelland, Lucie Stern Professor in the Social Sciences and Professor, by courtesy, of Linguistics
 John R. Rickford, J. E. Wallace Sterling Professor in the Humanities, Emeritus (recalled to active duty 2017–2019)
 Elizabeth Traugott, professor of linguistics and of English, emerita
 Tom Wasow, Clarence Irving Lewis Professor in Philosophy and professor of linguistics, emeritus and academic secretary to the university
 Annie Zaenen, Adjunct Professor
 Arnold M. Zwicky, Adjunct Professor

Literature and arts

 Gerald M. Ackerman, Assistant Professor of Art History (1965–1971)
 Judith Bettina, soprano
 Bahram Beyzai, Persian playwright and filmmaker
 Eavan Boland, Irish poet, professor
 George Hardin Brown, medieval literature
 Scott Bukatman, film and media professor
 Albert Elsen, Walter A. Haas Professor in the Humanities (1968–1995)
 Lowell Gallagher, literary theorist and associate professor, earned Ph.D. in 1989
 Hans Ulrich Gumbrecht, literary theorist
 D. R. MacDonald, creative writing
 Alexander Nemerov, professor of art and art history
 Juan Bautista Rael, linguist and folklorist
 Jack Rakove, professor in history, 1997 Pulitzer Prize winner
 Wallace Stegner, 1972 winner of Pulitzer Prize for Fiction
 Yvor Winters, poet and critic

Mathematics and statistics
 Theodore W. Anderson, professor in statistics, NAS member
 Harald Bohr (1887–1951), Danish Olympic silver medalist football player and mathematician; brother of Niels Bohr
 Emmanuel Candès, professor in mathematics and statistics, winner of Alan Waterman award
 Paul Cohen, former professor in mathematics, Fields Medal recipient, National Medal of Science winner
 Brian Conrad, professor in mathematics 
 George Dantzig, former professor in operations research, inventor of the simplex algorithm, father of linear programming, National Medal of Science (1975) winner
 Keith Devlin, executive director Center for the Study of Language and Information
 Persi Diaconis, professor in statistics, MacArthur Fellow, NAS member
 David Donoho, professor in statistics, MacArthur Fellow, NAS member
 Bradley Efron, professor in statistics, inventor of bootstrap, National Medal of Science winner, MacArthur Fellow, NAS member
 Solomon Feferman, professor in mathematics and philosophy, Schock Prize recipient
 Jerome H. Friedman, professor in statistics, NAS member
 Samuel Karlin, professor in mathematics, National Medal of Science winner
 Joseph Keller, professor in mathematics, National Medal of Science winner
 Maryam Mirzakhani, professor in mathematics, Fields Medal recipient
 Amnon Pazy, Israeli mathematician; President of the Hebrew University of Jerusalem
 George Pólya, former professor in mathematics, author of How to solve it
 Richard Schoen, professor in mathematics, MacArthur Fellow, NAS member
 David O. Siegmund, professor in statistics, NAS member
 Charles Stein, professor in statistics, NAS member
 Gábor Szegő, former professor in mathematics, founder of Stanford Math department
 Robert Tibshirani, professor in statistics, NAS member
 Ravi Vakil, professor in mathematics, one of seven four-time Putnam Fellows
 Akshay Venkatesh, former professor in mathematics, Fields Medal recipient
 Shing-Tung Yau, former professor in mathematics, Fields Medal recipient
Grant Sanderson, YouTuber, podcaster and owner of mathematics channel 3blue1brown, contributor to Khan Academy.

Political science

 Coit D. Blacker, political science professor, special assistant to the President for National Security Affairs; and senior director for Russian, Ukrainian and Eurasian affairs, National Security Council; Executive Office of the President
 Larry Diamond, professor, mentor, senior fellow at the Hoover Institute
 Morris P. Fiorina, political scientist and author
 Francis Fukuyama, senior fellow at the Center on Democracy, Development and the Rule of Law since 2010
 Terry Karl, professor of Latin American studies
 Alexander Kerensky (1881–1970), Russian revolutionary leader, Hoover Institute fellow
 Condoleezza Rice, political science professor, Secretary of State
 Douglas Rivers, political science professor, chief scientist of YouGov

Philosophy
 Joshua Cohen, professor emeritus of philosophy
 Lala Hardayal, lecturer, Indian freedom fighter
 Patrick Suppes, National Medal of Science recipient, professor

Physics
 Felix Bloch, 1952 Nobel Laureate, physics professor
 Steven Chu, 1997 Nobel Prize-winning physics professor; professor at Stanford 1987–2004
 Eric Cornell (B.S. 1985), 2001 Nobel Prize winner in physics
 Jerome Friedman, 1990 Nobel prize winner in physics, worked at SLAC as research associate (1957–1960)
 Sheldon Glashow, 1979 Nobel prize winner in physics, assistant professor (1961–1962)
 Theodor Hänsch, 2005 Nobel prize winner in physics, worked at Stanford 1972–1986
 Conyers Herring, physics professor and the winner of Wolf Prize in Physics in 1984/85
 Robert Hofstadter, 1961 Nobel prize winner in physics, former professor
 Henry Way Kendall, 1990 Nobel prize winner in physics, assistant professor at Stanford (1958–1961)
 Willis Eugene Lamb, former professor, 1955 Nobel prize winner in physics
 Robert Laughlin, 1998 Nobel Prize-winning physics professor, professor at Stanford 1989–2004
 Ann Nelson, 2018 J. J. Sakurai Prize for Theoretical Particle Physics recipient
 Douglas Osheroff, 1996 Nobel Prize-winning physics professor
 Martin L. Perl, 1995 Nobel Prize-winning physics professor
 Burton Richter, 1976 Nobel Prize-winning physics professor
 Arthur Schawlow, 1981 Nobel Prize-winning physics professor, co-inventor of laser, inducted into National Inventors Hall of Fame
 Leonard Schiff, physics professor
 Melvin Schwartz, 1988 Nobel Prize-winning physics professor
 William Shockley, 1956 Nobel Prize-winning physics professor, co-inventor of transistor, inducted into National Inventors Hall of Fame
 Leonard Susskind, physics professor, originator of string theory
 Richard Taylor (Ph.D. 1962), 1990 Nobel Prize-winning physics professor
 Carl Wieman (Ph.D. 1977), 2001 Nobel Prize winner in physics
 Kenneth G. Wilson, 1982 Nobel Prize winner in physics, worked at SLAC (1969–1970)

Psychology
 Richard Atkinson, professor of psychology 1956–1980, former president, University of California
 Albert Bandura, professor of psychology since 1964, David Starr Jordan Professor of Social Science in Psychology since 1973, known for his work on social learning theory and, more recently, on social cognitive theory and self efficacy
 Gordon H. Bower, professor of psychology, 2005 National Medal of Science winner
 Carol Dweck, professor of psychology, known for her work on the mindset psychological trait
 Jennifer Eberhardt, professor of psychology, 2014 MacArthur Fellow
Kalanit Grill-Spector, professor of psychology
 Roger Shepard, professor of psychology, National Medal of Science winner
 Edward Kellog Strong, Jr. (1884–1963), professor of psychology at Stanford University 1923–1963
 Lewis Terman, former professor, pioneer in I.Q. testing
 Leanne M. Williams, professor in  Psychiatry and Behavioral Sciences since 2013 
 Philip Zimbardo, former professor of psychology, former president of the APA, researcher
 Amado M. Padilla, professor of psychology

Hoover Fellows
Jim Mattis, U.S. Secretary of Defense (2017–2019)
Abbas Milani, political scientist and historian
George Shultz, U.S. Secretary of State (1982–1989), U.S. Secretary of the Treasury (1972–1974), U.S. Secretary of Labor (1969–1970), also lectured at the Graduate School of Business
Amy Zegart, political scientist and intelligence reform expert

Coaches
 Dick Gould, greatest tennis coach in history; from 1966 to 2004 he won 17 NCAA Team titles with 50 All American players
 Payton Jordan, track coach 1957–1979; head coach of the 1968 US Olympic track team
 Bill Walsh, twice head coach of the football team; also served as interim athletic director; coach of the three-time Super Bowl champion San Francisco 49ers; inventor of the West Coast Offense
 Glenn Scobey Warner, College Football Hall of Fame coach known as "Pop" Warner, brought the following mechanics to football: the screen pass, spiral punt, single- and double-wing formations, the use of shoulder and thigh pads, designed helmets red for backs and white for ends

Other
 St. Clair Drake, sociology and anthropology, founding head of African American studies program
 James M. Hyde, metallurgist
 Scotty McLennan, Dean for Religious Life, Minister of Stanford Memorial Church, and inspiration for the Reverend Scot Sloan character in the comic strip Doonesbury

Stanford athletes

Baseball

 Rubén Amaro, Jr., Major League Baseball outfielder, former Phillies General Manager, and coach
 Bob Boone, retired Major League Baseball catcher and manager; played for the Philadelphia Phillies and the California Angels
 Eric Bruntlett, retired Major League Baseball infielder; played for the Philadelphia Phillies, Houston Astros and the New York Yankees
 Jason Castro, Major League Baseball catcher for the Houston Astros
 Sam Fuld, Major League Baseball outfielder for the Oakland Athletics and General Manager for the Philadelphia Phillies
 John Gall, retired Major League Baseball outfielder and first baseman
 Ryan Garko, Major League Baseball outfielder, first baseman and designated hitter; played for the Cleveland Indians, the San Francisco Giants, and the Texas Rangers
 Jody Gerut, retired Major League Baseball outfielder; played for the Cleveland Indians and the Chicago Cubs
 Shawn Green (attended), retired Major League Baseball right fielder and outfielder; played for the Toronto Blue Jays, Los Angeles Dodgers and the Arizona Diamondbacks
 Jeremy Guthrie, Major League Baseball pitcher for the Kansas City Royals
 Jeffrey Hammonds, retired Major League Baseball outfielder; played for the Baltimore Orioles, Cincinnati Reds and the Colorado Rockies
 Rick Helling, retired Major League Baseball pitcher
 Brian Johnson, retired Major League Baseball catcher; played for the San Diego Padres, Detroit Tigers and the San Francisco Giants
 Bob Kammeyer, retired Major League Baseball pitcher; played for the New York Yankees
 Jim Lonborg, retired Major League Baseball pitcher; played for the Boston Red Sox, Milwaukee Brewers and the Philadelphia Phillies
 Andrew Lorraine, Major League Baseball pitcher; player for the California Angels, Chicago White Sox, Oakland Athletics, Seattle Mariners, Chicago Cubs, Cleveland Indians, and Milwaukee Brewers
 Jed Lowrie, Major League Baseball infielder with the Oakland Athletics
 John Mayberry, Jr., Major League Baseball outfielder for the Philadelphia Phillies
 David McCarty, retired Major League Baseball first baseman and outfielder; played for the Minnesota Twins, San Francisco Giants, Seattle Mariners, Kansas City Royals, Tampa Bay Devil Rays, Oakland Athletics and the Boston Red Sox
 Jack McDowell, retired Major League Baseball pitcher; played for the Chicago White Sox, New York Yankees and the Cleveland Indians
 Mike Mussina, retired Major League Baseball pitcher; played for the Baltimore Orioles and the New York Yankees
 Carlos Quentin, Major League Baseball outfielder for the San Diego Padres
 Greg Reynolds, Major League Baseball pitcher; played for the Colorado Rockies
 Bruce Robinson, retired Major League Baseball catcher; played for Oakland A's and the New York Yankees
 Ed Sprague, retired Major League Baseball third baseman and current head baseball coach at the University of the Pacific; played for the Toronto Blue Jays, Oakland Athletics and the Pittsburgh Pirates
 Michael Taylor, Major League Baseball outfielder for the Oakland Athletics
 Justin Wayne, retired Major League Baseball pitcher; played for the Florida Marlins

Basketball

 Jennifer Azzi, ABL and WNBA
 Curtis Borchardt and his wife Susan King Borchardt
 Mike Bratz, former NBA player
Anthony Brown (B.A. 2014), basketball player in the Israeli Basketball Premier League
 Greg Butler
 Josh Childress
 Jarron Collins
 Jason Collins, first openly gay active male athlete in a major North American professional team sport
 Landry Fields
 Kristin Folkl
 Dan Grunfeld
 Sonja Henning, ABL and WNBA
 Casey Jacobsen
 Teyo Johnson, basketball and football
 Adam Keefe
 Brevin Knight
 Brook Lopez
 Robin Lopez
 Todd Lichti
 Hank Luisetti
 Mark Madsen
 Carolyn Moos
 Vanessa Nygaard
 Chiney Ogwumike, current WNBA player; top WNBA draft pick and Rookie of the Year in 2014
 Nneka Ogwumike, current WNBA player; top WNBA draft pick and Rookie of the Year in 2012, and WNBA MVP in 2016
 Josh Owens (B.A. 2012), basketball player for Hapoel Tel Aviv of the Israeli Basketball Premier League
 Angie Paccione
 Kate Paye
 Nicole Powell, WNBA
 Olympia Scott, WNBA
 Kate Starbird
 Andrew Vlahov, four-time Olympian for Australia
 Jamila Wideman
 Candice Wiggins, WNBA
 Lindsey Yamasaki (2002), volleyball and basketball, WNBA
 George Yardley, Basketball Hall of Fame member

Football

 Frankie Albert (1942), former quarterback in the National Football League; played for the San Francisco 49ers
 Jon Alston (2006), linebacker in the National Football League; played for the St. Louis Rams
 Lester Archambeau (1990), retired defensive end in the National Football League; played for the Green Bay Packers, Atlanta Falcons and the Denver Broncos
 Oshiomogho Atogwe (2005), free safety in the National Football League; played for the St. Louis Rams and the Washington Redskins
 Brad Badger (1997), guard and tackle in the National Football League; played for the Washington Redskins, Minnesota Vikings and the Oakland Raiders
 David Bergeron (2005), linebacker in the National Football League; plays for the Carolina Panthers
 Colin Branch (2003?), free safety of the National Football League; played for the Carolina Panthers
 John Brodie (1956), retired quarterback in the National Football League; played for the San Francisco 49ers, had a second career as a Senior PGA Tour professional golfer
 Greg Camarillo (2006), wide receiver in the National Football League; played for the San Diego Chargers and the Miami Dolphins
 Kirk Chambers (2004), offensive tackle in the National Football League; played for the Cleveland Browns
 Trent Edwards (2007), quarterback in the National Football League; plays for the Philadelphia Eagles
 John Elway (A.B. 1982), retired Hall of Fame National Football League quarterback and current executive vice president of football operations for the Denver Broncos
 Toby Gerhart (2010), running back in the National Football League; plays for the Minnesota Vikings
 Darrien Gordon (1993), retired defensive back in the National Football League; played for the San Diego Chargers, Denver Broncos and the Oakland Raiders
 Jerry Gustafson (1956), BC Lions
 Coby Fleener (2012), tight end in the National Football League; plays for the Indianapolis Colts
 Kwame Harris (2003), offensive tackle in the National Football League; played for the San Francisco 49ers and the Oakland Raiders
 Emile Harry, retired wide receiver in the National Football League; played for the Kansas City Chiefs and the Los Angeles Rams
 Eric Heitmann (2002), center in the National Football League; played for the San Francisco 49ers
 Tony Hill (1977?), three-time Pro Bowl National Football League wide receiver; played for the Dallas Cowboys
 James Lofton (1978), retired wide receiver in the National Football League; played for the Green Bay Packers and the Los Angeles Raiders, was the NCAA champion in the long jump in 1978 while attending Stanford University
 Erik Lorig (2009), fullback in the National Football League; plays for the Tampa Bay Buccaneers
 Bryce Love (2019), running back in the National Football League; plays for the Washington Redskins; 2017 winner of the Doak Walker Award
 Andrew Luck (2012), quarterback in the National Football League; plays for the Indianapolis Colts
 John Lynch (1993), retired strong safety in the National Football League and current NFL on Fox color commentator; played for the Tampa Bay Buccaneers
 John Macaulay, San Francisco 49ers center
 Ken Margerum (1981), retired wide receiver in the National Football League; played for the Chicago Bears and San Francisco 49ers
 Christian McCaffrey (2016), running back for the San Francisco 49ers and the Carolina Panthers; NCAA record holder for all-purpose yards in a single season (2015); 2015 Heisman Trophy finalist
 Ed McCaffrey (1991), retired wide receiver in the National Football League; played for the New York Giants, San Francisco 49ers and the Denver Broncos
 Jim Merlo (1973), retired linebacker in the National Football League; played for the New Orleans Saints
 Trent Murphy (2013), outside linebacker in the National Football League; played for the Washington Redskins and Buffalo Bills
 Brad Muster (1989), retired fullback in the National Football League; played for the Chicago Bears and New Orleans Saints
 Darrin Nelson (1982), retired running back and Kick Returner in the National Football League; played for the Minnesota Vikings
 Ernie Nevers (1925), former fullback for the Duluth Eskimos and the Chicago Cardinals of the National Football League; former pitcher for the St. Louis Browns of Major League Baseball
 Hank Norberg (1942), end for the San Francisco 49ers and Chicago Bears
 Babatunde Oshinowo (2006), defensive tackle in the National Football League; played for the Cleveland Browns
 Jim Plunkett (1970), retired quarterback in the National Football League, 1970 Heisman Trophy winner; played for the New England Patriots, San Francisco 49ers and the Oakland/Los Angeles Raiders
 Jon Ritchie (1997), retired fullback in the National Football League; played for the Oakland Raiders and the Philadelphia Eagles
 T.J. Rushing (2006), cornerback and return specialist; played for the Indianapolis Colts of the National Football League
 Richard Sherman (2011), cornerback in the National Football League; plays for the San Francisco 49ers
 Alex Smith (2005), tight end in the National Football League; plays for the Cleveland Browns of the National Football League
 Donnie Spragan (1999), linebacker in the National Football League; played for the New Orleans Saints and the Green Bay Packers
 Will Svitek (2005), offensive tackle for the Atlanta Falcons of the National Football League
 Leigh Torrence (2005), cornerback in the National Football League; played for the Green Bay Packers and the Atlanta Falcons
 Chris Walsh (1992), retired wide receiver in the National Football League; played for the Buffalo Bills and Minnesota Vikings
 Bob Whitfield (1992), retired tackle in the National Football League; played for the Atlanta Falcons, Jacksonville Jaguars and the New York Giants
 Tank Williams (2002), safety in the National Football League; played for the Tennessee Titans and the Minnesota Vikings
 Coy Wire (2002), linebacker and safety in the National Football League; played for the Buffalo Bills
 Kailee Wong (1998), retired linebacker in the National Football League; played for the Minnesota Vikings and the Houston Texans
 Zach Ertz Tight End for the Arizona Cardinals. He also played for the Philadelphia Eagles and won SuperBowl LII with them.

Golf

 Notah Begay III
 Hilary Lunke
 Casey Martin
 Tom Watson
 Michelle Wie
 Tiger Woods (dropped out)
 Patrick Rodgers

Gymnastics
 Amy Chow, Olympic gold medalist 
 Nancy Goldsmith, Israeli Olympic gymnast
 Ivana Hong, U.S. Olympic team alternate and 2007 World Champion
 Carly Janiga, NCAA champion in uneven bars, 2010
 Heather Purnell, captain of 2004 Canadian Olympic Team
 Jennifer Sey, former U.S. National Gymnastics Champion
 Samantha Shapiro, five-time member of the USA Gymnastics National Team, 2007 U.S. junior uneven bars champion, 2008 U.S. junior uneven bars and balance beam champion
 Kerri Strug, Olympic gold medalist

Rowing
 Adam Kreek, rowing, Canadian National Team
 Elle Logan, two-time gold medal-winning rower in 2008 Beijing Olympics and in 2012 London Olympics
 Kent Mitchell, two-time Olympic champion, two-time national champion, member of Stanford Hall of Fame
 Jamie Schroeder, rowing, U.S. National Team

Soccer
 Nicole Barnhart, National Women's Soccer League and US national team; currently plays for Utah Royals FC
 Rachel Buehler, former National Women's Soccer League and US national team; formerly played for Portland Thorns FC (retired)
 Tierna Davidson, National women's soccer league and United States women's national team; currently plays with Chicago Red Stars
 Todd Dunivant, Major League Soccer; currently plays for Los Angeles Galaxy
 Simon Elliott, New Zealand national soccer team player; Chivas USA
 Julie Foudy, former US national team soccer player
 Adam Jahn, currently plays for San Jose Earthquakes
 Roger Levesque, former Major League Soccer soccer player
 Camille Levin, soccer player
 Chad Marshall, Major League Soccer; currently plays for Columbus Crew
 Ryan Nelsen, New Zealand international soccer player; formerly with D.C. United in MLS, now with Blackburn Rovers in English Premiership
 Mariah Nogueira, former National Women's Soccer League; formerly played for Seattle Reign FC (retired)
 Teresa Noyola, Nadeshiko League Japan women's league and Mexico national team; currently plays for FC Kibi International University Charme
 Kelley O'Hara, National Women's Soccer League and US national team; currently plays for Washington Spirit
 Christen Press, Damallsvenskan, National Women's Soccer League and US national team; currently plays for Angel City FC
 Tierna Davidson, National Women's Soccer League, United States women's national soccer team; currently plays for Chicago Red Stars
 Ali Riley, Damallsvenskan and New Zealand national team; currently plays for ACFC
 Lindsay Taylor, former National Women's Soccer League; played for Washington Spirit
 Ben Zinn, international soccer player and academic at Georgia Tech

Swimming
 Randall Bal
 Elaine Breeden, member of 2008 U.S. Olympic team
 Elin Austevoll, member of 1996 Norwegian Olympic team
 Maya DiRado, double gold medal winner in the 2016 Summer Olympics
 Jason Dunford, member of 2008 Kenyan Olympic team
 Janet Evans, four time Olympic gold-medalist 
 Catherine Fox, double gold medal winner in the 1996 Olympics in Atlanta
 John Hencken
 Misty Hyman, gold medalist in the 2000 Olympic Games
 Jenna Johnson, three-time medalist in the 1984 Olympic Games
 Janel Jorgensen, member of the 1988 U.S. Olympic team in Seoul, South Korea
 Tara Kirk
 Katie Ledecky (Class of 2020), seven-time Olympic gold medalist
 Peter Marshall
 Lea Loveless Maurer, formerly head coach of Stanford Cardinal women's swimming and diving team
 John Moffet, member of the 1980 and 1984 United States Olympic teams
 Pablo Morales, two-time gold medalist 1992 Olympics, medalist in 1984 Olympics
 Anthony Mosse (OBE BA (Hons) & MBA), Olympic medalist, 1988
 Andrea Murez, Israeli-American Olympic swimmer for Israel
 Lia Neal, swimmer, two-time Olympic medalist
 Susan Rapp, medalist 1984 Olympics, member 1980 Olympic team
 Brian Retterer
 Markus Rogan
 Jeff Rouse
 Gabrielle Rose
 Summer Sanders
 Julia Smit, member of 2008 Olympic team
 Jenny Thompson
 Ben Wildman-Tobriner, double gold medal winner in the 2007 World Aquatics Championships, 2008 Gold Medal Olympic swimmer, former world record holder

Tennis

 Geoff Abrams
Kristie Ahn
 Bob Bryan (dropped out)
 Mike Bryan (dropped out)
 Elise Burgin	
 Pat DuPré
Nicole Gibbs
 Paul Goldstein
 Dick Gould 
 Jim Grabb
Laura Granville
 Jim Gurfein
 Julie Heldman
 John Letts
 Scott Lipsky
 Sandy Mayer
 John McEnroe (dropped out)
 Patrick McEnroe
 Matt Mitchell
 Peter Rennert
 Donna Rubin (born 1959)
Jeff "Salzy" Salzenstein
 Jonathan Stark
 Roscoe Tanner

Track and field

 Mike Boit (M.S. 78), bronze medal at 1972 Munich Olympics in 800m track
 Russell Wolf Brown, professional miler
 Jillian Camarena-Williams, shot put, 2008 Beijing Olympics
 Ian Dobson, track and field, 2008 Olympics
 Ryan Hall, cross country, track and field
 Regina Jacobs, cross country, track and field
 Bob Mathias (1953), Decathlon, gold medal at 1948 and 1952 Olympics; U.S. Congressman
 Steven Solomon, track and field, 2012 Olympics
 Toby Stevenson, pole vault

Volleyball
 Scott Fortune (1988), gold medal at 1988 Seoul Olympics, team captain of bronze medal team at 1992 Barcelona Olympics
 Alix Klineman (2011), bronze medal at the 2011 Pan American Games 
 Ogonna Nnamani (B.A.S. 2005), 2004 Olympian, winner of 2005 Honda-Broderick Cup
 Beverly Oden (1993), 1996 Olympian, 1990 AVCA Player of the Year, 1985 Honda-Broderick Award
 Kim Oden (1986), 1988, 1992 Olympic team captain, Player of the Decade for 1980s AVCA's All-Decade Team
 Jon Root (1986), gold medal at 1988 Seoul Olympics
 Erik Shoji (2009), bronze medal at 2016 Rio Olympics
 Kawika Shoji (2007), bronze medal at 2016 Rio Olympics
 Logan Tom (2003), professional beach volleyball, 2000 Olympian
 Kerri Walsh Jennings (1999), 2004, 2008, and 2012 Olympic gold medalist in beach volleyball

Water polo
 Tony Azevedo
 Ellen Estes, Olympic water polo player
 Ashley Grossman, water polo player
 Brenda Villa, Olympic water polo player

Other sports

 Nick Bravin, Olympic fencer
 John Coyle (B.S. 1990 Engineering), Olympic speed skater, silver medalist at the 1994 Winter Olympics as a member of the men's 5,000 meter relay team
 Rachael Flatt (B.S. 2015), ice skater in 2010 Winter Olympics
 Matt Gentry (B.A. 2004), wrestler, 2008 Canadian Olympic team member, 2004 NCAA Div. I National Champion
 Eric Heiden (B.S. 1984, M.D. 1991), speed skater, 5 gold medals at 1980 Lake Placid Olympics; cycling, competed in 1985 Giro D'Italia, 1986 Tour de France
 Alexander Massialas (B.S. 2016 Mechanical Engineering), Olympic fencer, 2016 silver medalist in individual Men's Foil, 2020 bronze medalist in Team Foil
Dorian "Doc" Paskowitz, surfer and physician
 Ramona Shelburne, softball player and sportswriter
 Sami Jo Small (B.S. Engineering 1998), Olympic and professional women's ice hockey goalie, Stanford University Men's Hockey, Pac-8 Conference (ACHA) MVP, silver medalist, 1998 Winter Olympics; gold medalist, 2002 Winter Olympics and 2006 Winter Olympics
 Debi Thomas (B.S. Engineering 1989), figure skater, bronze medalist at the 1988 Winter Olympics
 Josh Thomson (attended), wrestler, current mixed martial artist in the Ultimate Fighting Championship Lightweight Division

Notable current students
Sophia Kianni, climate activist, UN advisor
Rachel Grant, climate activist 
 Ethan Josh Lee, Korean-American actor
 Simone Manuel, swimmer, four-time Olympic medalist and two-time Olympic gold medalist 
 David Mazouz, American actor
 Elizabeth Price, gymnast
 Maggie Steffens, water polo, gold medal at the 2012 Summer Olympics
Tan Sze En, Singaporean gymnast

Fictional Stanford alumni

In film 
 In Avatar, Grace Augustine wears a Stanford T-shirt.
 In The American President, President Andrew Shepherd mentions that he went to Stanford.
 Takagi in Die Hard graduated from Stanford Law School in 1962.
 The 1944 film Double Indemnity is about a wife who conspires with her lover to kill her husband in Palo Alto on his way to a Stanford reunion.
 The main character of Antitrust is depicted as a Stanford graduate.
In Bourne, Aaron Kalloor and Heather Lee attended Stanford.

In literature 
 Chloe Steele in the Left Behind series (1995–2007) by Tim LaHaye and Jerry B. Jenkins attended Stanford.
Aron Trask (aka Aaron Trask) in East of Eden (1952) by John Steinbeck is enrolled at Stanford University when he runs away to join the U.S. Army during World War I.

In television 
 Star Trek character Jonathan Archer studied at Stanford.
 Dana Scully in The X-Files earned her medical degree from Stanford University.
Chucks main character, Chuck Bartowski, is presented as a Stanford dropout.
 In Grey's Anatomy, Cristina Yang holds a Doctor of Medicine from Stanford, where her former boyfriend Colin Marlowe was a professor.
 Captain B. J. Hunnicutt in M*A*S*H graduated from Stanford.
 Kate Warner and Wayne Palmer in 24 have Stanford degrees.
 Stella (Ted's almost bride) in How I Met Your Mother attended Stanford as both an undergrad and medical school graduate.
 Detective Kate Beckett in Castle attended Stanford as a pre-law undergrad.
 Julia in Parenthood attended Stanford for law school.
 Lloyd in Entourage received his MBA from Stanford.
 The West Wing character Joey Lucas, portrayed by Marlee Matlin, graduated from Stanford.
 The West Wing character Surgeon General Millicent Griffith, portrayed by Mary Kay Place, graduated from Stanford.
 Supernatural character Sam Winchester, portrayed by Jared Padalecki, was studying law at Stanford.
 Maya Gallo in Just Shoot Me! attended Stanford.

See also 

 List of companies founded by Stanford University alumni

References

Lists of people by university or college in California
People